This is a list of published International Organization for Standardization (ISO) standards and other deliverables. For a complete and up-to-date list of all the ISO standards, see the ISO catalogue.

The standards are protected by copyright and most of them must be purchased. However, about 300 of the standards produced by ISO and IEC's Joint Technical Committee 1 (JTC 1) have been made freely and publicly available.

ISO 1 – ISO 199 
 ISO 1:2016 Geometrical product specifications (GPS) — Standard reference temperature for the specification of geometrical and dimensional properties
 ISO GUIDE 1:1972 Presentation of International Standards and technical reports [Withdrawn without replacement]
 IWA 1:2005 Quality management systems — Guidelines for process improvements in health service organizations [Withdrawn without replacement]
 ISO 2:1973 Textiles — Designation of the direction of twist in yarns and related products
 ISO/IEC GUIDE 2:2004 Standardization and related activities — General vocabulary
 IWA 2:2007 Quality management systems — Guidelines for the application of ISO 9001:2000 in education [Withdrawn without replacement]
 ISO 3:1973 Preferred numbers — Series of preferred numbers
 IWA 3:2005 Image safety — Reducing the incidence of undesirable biomedical effects caused by visual image sequences [Withdrawn without replacement]
 ISO/IEC GUIDE 3:1981 Identification of national standards that are equivalent to International Standards [Withdrawn: replaced with ISO/IEC GUIDE 21:1999, now ISO/IEC GUIDE 21-1:2005 and ISO/IEC GUIDE 21-2:2005]
 ISO 4:1997 Information and documentation — Rules for the abbreviation of title words and titles of publications
 ISO GUIDE 4:1975 Preparation of standard methods of measuring performance of consumer goods (SMMP) [Withdrawn: replaced with ISO/IEC GUIDE 36:1982, now Withdrawn without replacement]
 IWA 4:2009 Quality management systems — Guidelines for the application of ISO 9001:2008 in local government [Withdrawn: replaced with ISO 18091:2014, now ISO 18091:2019]
 ISO 5 Photography and graphic technology — Density measurements
 ISO 5-1:2009 Part 1: Geometry and functional notation
 ISO 5-2:2009 Part 2: Geometric conditions for transmittance density
 ISO 5-3:2009 Part 3: Spectral conditions
 ISO 5-4:2009 Part 4: Geometric conditions for reflection density
 IWA 5:2006 Emergency preparedness [Withdrawn without replacement]
 ISO GUIDE 5:1976 Designation of internationally standardized items [Withdrawn without replacement]
 ISO 6:1993 Photography — Black-and-white pictorial still camera negative film/process systems — Determination of ISO speed
 IWA 6:2008 Guidelines for the management of drinking water utilities under crisis conditions [Withdrawn without replacement]
 ISO GUIDE 6:1977 Mention of reference materials in International Standards [Withdrawn without replacement]
 ISO 7:Pipe threads where pressure-tight joints are made on the threads
 ISO 7-1:1994 Part 1: Dimensions, tolerances and designation
 ISO 7-1:1994/COR 1:2007 Technical Corrigendum 1
 ISO 7-2:2000 Part 2: Verification by means of limit gauges
 ISO/IEC GUIDE 7:1994 Guidelines for drafting of standards suitable for use for conformity assessment [Withdrawn: replaced with ISO/IEC 17007:2009]
 ISO 8:2019 Information and documentation — Presentation and identification of periodicals. For the 8-bit coded character set, see ISO/IEC 8859
 ISO GUIDE 8:1977 Guidelines for a national standards information centre [Withdrawn without replacement]
 IWA 8:2009 Tableware, giftware, jewellery, luminaries — Glass clarity — Classification and test method [Withdrawn without replacement]
 ISO 9:1995 Information and documentation — Transliteration of Cyrillic characters into Latin characters — Slavic and non-Slavic languages
 ISO GUIDE 9:1976 Courses in standardization [Withdrawn without replacement]
 IWA 9:2011 Framework for managing sustainable development in business districts [Withdrawn without replacement]
 ISO/R 10:1955 Aircraft — Ground air-conditioning connections for pressure cabins [Withdrawn: replaced with ISO 1034]
 ISO GUIDE 10:1977 Registration of standardizing bodies [Withdrawn without replacement]
 ISO 11:1987 Aircraft — Ground pressure testing connections for pressure cabins
 ISO 12:1987 Aerospace — Pipelines — Identification
 ISO 13:1978 Grey iron pipes, special castings and grey iron parts for pressure main lines [Withdrawn without replacement]
 ISO 14:1982 Straight-sided splines for cylindrical shafts with internal centering — Dimensions, tolerances and verification
 ISO 15:2017 Rolling bearings — Radial bearings — Boundary dimensions, general plan
 ISO 16:1975 Acoustics — Standard tuning frequency (Standard musical pitch)
 ISO 17:1973 Guide to the use of preferred numbers and of series of preferred numbers
 ISO 18:1981 Documentation — Contents list of periodicals
 ISO/R 19:1956 Shipbuilding — Inland navigation — Deckbolts [Withdrawn without replacement]
 ISO/R 20:1956 Shipbuilding — Inland navigation — Rivets for Hatches [Withdrawn without replacement]
 ISO 21:1985 Shipbuilding — Inland navigation — Cable-lifters for stud-link anchor chains [Withdrawn without replacement]
 ISO 22:1991 Belt drives — Flat transmission belts and corresponding pulleys — Dimensions and tolerances
 ISO 23:1993 Cinematography — Camera usage of 35 mm motion-picture film — Specifications
 ISO/R 24:1956 Cinematography — Projector usage of 35 mm motion-picture films for direct front projection — Specifications [Withdrawn: replaced with ISO 2939]
 ISO 25:1994 Cinematography — Camera usage of 16 mm motion-picture film — Specifications
 ISO 26:1993 Cinematography — Projector usage of 16 mm motion-picture films for direct front projection — Specifications
 ISO/R 27:1956 Cinematography — Emulsion and sound record positions in camera for 16 mm motion-picture films [Withdrawn without replacement]
 ISO 28:1976 Cinematography — Camera usage of 8 mm Type R motion-picture film — Specifications
 ISO 29:1980 Cinematography — Projector usage of 8 mm Type R silent motion-picture film for direct front projection — Specifications [Withdrawn without replacement]
 ISO/R 30:1956 Bibliographical strip [Withdrawn without replacement]
 ISO 31:Quantities and units [Withdrawn: replaced with ISO/IEC 80000]
 ISO 32:1977 Gas cylinders for medical use — Marking for identification of content
 ISO/R 33:1957 Rubber, vulcanized or thermoplastic — Du Pont constant load method of measuring abrasion resistance of vulcanized natural and synthetic rubbers [Withdrawn without replacement]
 ISO 34 Rubber, vulcanized or thermoplastic — Determination of tear strength measuring abrasion resistance of vulcanized natural and synthetic rubbers
 ISO 34-1:2015 Part 1: Trouser, angle and crescent test pieces
 ISO 34-2:2015 Part 2: Small (Delft) test pieces
 ISO 35:2004 Natural rubber latex concentrate — Determination of mechanical stability
 ISO 36:2020 Rubber, vulcanized or thermoplastic — Determination of adhesion to textile fabrics
 ISO 37:2017 Rubber, vulcanized or thermoplastic — Determination of tensile stress-strain properties
 ISO/R 38:1957 Shipbuilding — Bollards [Withdrawn without replacement]
 ISO/R 39:1957 Shipbuilding — Anchor Chains — Lugless Joining Shackles [Withdrawn: replaced with ISO 1704]
 ISO/R 40:1957 Shipbuilding — Anchor Chains — Studless Links [Withdrawn: replaced with ISO 1704]
 ISO 41:1980 Shipbuilding — Inland vessels — Covers for deck openings for pumps [Withdrawn without replacement]
 ISO/R 42:1957 Shipbuilding — Inland vessels — Mushroom-type ventilator heads [Withdrawn: replaced by ISO 3372, now withdrawn without replacement]
 ISO 43:2016 Aircraft — Jacking pads
 ISO 44:1975 Aerospace — Lever-operated, two-position, ON/OFF switches — Directions of operation [Withdrawn without replacement]
 ISO 45:1990 Aircraft — Pressure refuelling connections
 ISO 46:1973 Aircraft — Fuel nozzle grounding plugs and sockets
 ISO/R 47:1957 Aircraft — Toilet connections [Withdrawn: replaced with ISO 17775]
 ISO 48 Rubber, vulcanized or thermoplastic — Determination of hardness
 ISO 48-1:2018 Part 1: Introduction and guidance
 ISO 48-2:2018 Part 2: Hardness between 10 IRHD and 100 IRHD
 ISO 48-3:2018 Part 3: Dead-load hardness using the very low rubber hardness (VLRH) scale
 ISO 48-4:2018 Part 4: Indentation hardness by durometer method (Shore hardness)
 ISO 48-5:2018 Part 5: Indentation hardness by IRHD pocket meter method
 ISO 48-6:2018 Part 6: Apparent hardness of rubber-covered rollers by IRHD method
 ISO 48-7:2018 Part 7: Apparent hardness of rubber-covered rollers by Shore-type durometer method
 ISO 48-8:2018 Part 8: Apparent hardness of rubber-covered rollers by Pusey and Jones method
 ISO 48-9:2018 Part 9: Calibration and verification of hardness testers
 ISO 49:1994 Malleable cast iron fittings threaded to ISO 7-1
 ISO 50:1977 Metal pipes — Steel sockets screwed according to ISO 7 [Withdrawn without replacement]
 ISO/R 51:1957 Shipbuilding — Inland navigation — Pipe lines for the transport of combustible liquids — nominal diameters [Withdrawn without replacement]
 ISO/R 52:1957 Belt drives — Grooved pulleys — Sections A, B, C, D, and E [Withdrawn: replaced by ISO 4183]
 ISO 53:1998 Cylindrical gears for general and heavy engineering — Standard basic rack tooth profile
 ISO 54:1996 Cylindrical gears for general engineering and for heavy engineering — Modules
 ISO 55:1977 Seedlac — Specification [Withdrawn without replacement]
 ISO 56:1979 Shellac — Specification [Withdrawn without replacement]
 ISO 56-1:1979 Hand-made Shellac — Specification [Withdrawn without replacement]
 ISO 56-2:1979 Machine-made Shellac — Specification [Withdrawn without replacement]
 ISO 57:1975 Bleached lac — Specification [Withdrawn without replacement]
 ISO/R 58:1958 Substances of paper [Withdrawn without replacement]
 ISO 59:1976 Plastics — Determination of acetone-soluble matter [Withdrawn without replacement]
 ISO 60:1977 Plastics — Determination of apparent density of material that can be poured from a specified funnel
 ISO 61:1976 Plastics — Determination of apparent density of moulding material that cannot be poured from a specified funnel
 ISO 62:2008 Plastics — Determination of water absorption
 ISO 63:1975 Flat transmission belts — Lengths [Withdrawn: Replaced with ISO 22]
 ISO 64:1974 Steel tubes — Outside Diameters [Withdrawn: Replaced with ISO 4200]
 ISO 65:1981 Carbon steel tubes suitable for screwing in accordance with ISO 7-1 [Withdrawn without replacement]
 ISO/R 66:1958 Paper vocabulary — First series of terms [Withdrawn: Replaced with ISO 4046]
 ISO 67:1981 Muscovite mica blocks, thins and films — Grading by size [Withdrawn without replacement]
 ISO 68 ISO general-purpose screw threads – Basic profile
 ISO 68-1:1998 Part 1: Metric screw threads
 ISO 68-2:1998 Part 2: Inch screw threads
 ISO 69:1998 Cinematography — 16 mm motion-picture and magnetic film — Cutting and perforating dimensions
 ISO 70:1981 Cinematography — 35 mm negative photographic sound record on 35 mm motion-picture film — Position and maximum width dimensions
 ISO 71:2014 Cinematography — 16 mm negative photographic sound record on 16 mm, 35/16 mm and 35/32 mm motion-picture film — Positions and dimensions
 ISO/R 72:1958 Cinematography — Sound records and scanning area of 35 mm double width push-pull sound prints — Normal and offset centerline types [Withdrawn without replacement]
 ISO/R 73:1958 Cinematography — Image area produced by camera aperture and maximum projectable image area on 35 mm motion-picture film — Positions and dimensions [Withdrawn: replaced by ISO 2906 and ISO 2907]
 ISO 74:1976 Cinematography — Image area produced by camera aperture and maximum projectable image area on 8 mm Type R motion-picture film — Positions and dimensions
 ISO 75 Plastics — Determination of temperature of deflection under load
 ISO 75-1:2020 Part 1: General test method
 ISO 75-2:2013 Part 2: Plastics and ebonite
 ISO 75-3:2004 Part 3: High-strength thermosetting laminates and long-fibre-reinforced plastics
 ISO 76:2006 Rolling bearings — Static load ratings
 ISO/R 77:1958 Bibliographical references — Essential elements [Withdrawn without replacement]
 ISO 78 Chemistry — Layouts for standards
 ISO 78-2:1999 Part 2: Methods of chemical analysis
 ISO 78-3:1983 Part 3: Standard for molecular absorption spectrometry [Withdrawn without replacement]
 ISO 78-4:1983 Part 4: Standard for atomic absorption spectrometric analysis [Withdrawn without replacement]
 ISO/R 79:1968 Steel — Brinell hardness test [Withdrawn: replaced with ISO 6506-1 and ISO 6506-4]
 ISO/TR 79:2015 Reference materials – Examples of reference materials for qualitative properties
 ISO/R 80:1968 Steel — Rockwell hardness test (B and C scales) [Withdrawn: replaced with ISO 6508]
 ISO/R 81:1967 Steel — Vickers hardness test (Load 5 to 100 kgf) [Withdrawn: replaced with ISO 6507-1 and ISO 6507-4]
 ISO 82:1974 Steel — Tensile testing [Withdrawn: replaced with ISO 6892-1]
 ISO 83:1976 Steel — Charpy impact test (U-notch) [Withdrawn: replaced with ISO 148-1]
 ISO/R 84:1959 Steel — Izod impact test [Withdrawn without replacement]
 ISO/R 85:1959 Steel — Bend test [Withdrawn: replaced with ISO 7438]
 ISO 86:1974 Steel — Tensile testing of sheet and strip less than 3 mm and not less than 0,5 mm thick [Withdrawn: replaced with ISO 6892-1]
 ISO/R 87:1959 Steel — Simple bend testing of sheet and strip less than 3 mm thick [Withdrawn: replaced with ISO 7438]
 ISO/R 88:1959 Steel — Reverse bend testing of sheet and strip less than 3 mm thick [Withdrawn: replaced with ISO 7799]
 ISO 89:1974 Steel — Tensile testing of wire [Withdrawn: replaced with ISO 6892-1]
 ISO 90 Light gauge metal containers — Definitions and determination of dimensions and capacities
 ISO 90-1:1997 Part 1: Open-top cans
 ISO 90-2:1997 Part 2: General use containers
 ISO 90-3:2000 Part 3: Aerosol cans
 ISO 91:2017 Petroleum and related products — Temperature and pressure volume correction factors (petroleum measurement tables) and standard reference conditions
 ISO 92:1976 Textile machinery and accessories — Spinning machinery — Definition of side (left or right)
 ISO 93 Textile machinery and accessories — Cylindrical sliver cans
 ISO 93-1:2006 Part 1: Main dimensions
 ISO 93-2:2006 Part 2: Spring bottoms
 ISO 93-3:1981 Part 3: Packaging sliver cans (press cans) [Withdrawn without replacement]
 ISO 94:1982 Textile machinery and accessories — Spindle gauges for ring-spinning and ring-doubling frames
 ISO/R 95:1972 Textile machinery and accessories — Rings for ring-spinning and ring-doubling frames for "C" travellers [Withdrawn without replacement]
 ISO 96 Textile machinery and accessories — Rings and travellers for ring spinning and ring twisting frames
 ISO 96-1:2016 Part 1: Flange rings T and SF and their travellers
 ISO 96-2:2009 Part 2: HZ- and J-rings and their travellers
 ISO 97:1975 Textile machinery and accessories — Rings for spinning, doubling and twisting for ear-shaped travellers [Withdrawn: replaced with ISO 96-2]
 ISO 98:2001 Textile machinery and accessories — Spinning preparatory and spinning machinery — Main dimensions of coverings for top rollers
 ISO 99:1975 Pulleys for flat transmission belts — Diameters [Withdrawn: replaced with ISO 22]
 ISO 100:1984 Pulleys for flat transmission belts — Crowns [Withdrawn: replaced with ISO 22]
 ISO/R 101:1959 Width of sheets of paper [Withdrawn without replacement]
 ISO 102:1990 Aircraft — Gravity filling orifices
 ISO/R 103:1959 Aircraft — Instrument Cases — Sizes and mounting dimensions [Withdrawn without replacement]
 ISO 104:2015 Rolling bearings — Thrust bearings — Boundary dimensions, general plan
 ISO 105 Textiles — Tests for colour fastness
 ISO 105-A01:2010 Part A01: General principles of testing
 ISO 105-A02:1993 Part A02: Grey scale for assessing change in colour
 ISO 105-A03:2019 Part A03: Grey scale for assessing staining
 ISO 105-A04:1989 Part A04: Method for the instrumental assessment of the degree of staining of adjacent fabrics
 ISO 105-A05:1996 Part A05: Instrumental assessment of change in colour for determination of grey scale rating
 ISO 105-A06:1995 Part A06: Instrumental determination of 1/1 standard depth of colour
 ISO 105-A08:2001 Part A08: Vocabulary used in colour measurement
 ISO 105-A11:2012 Part A11: Determination of colour fastness grades by digital imaging techniques
 ISO 105-B01:2014 Part B01: Colour fastness to light: Daylight
 ISO 105-B02:2014 Part B02: Colour fastness to artificial light: Xenon arc fading lamp test
 ISO 105-B03:2017 Part B03: Colour fastness to weathering: Outdoor exposure
 ISO 105-B04:1994 Part B04: Colour fastness to artificial weathering: Xenon arc fading lamp test
 ISO 105-B05:1993 Part B05: Detection and assessment of photochromism
 ISO 105-B06:2020 Part B06: Colour fastness and ageing to artificial light at high temperatures: Xenon arc fading lamp test
 ISO 105-B07:2009 Part B07: Colour fastness to light of textiles wetted with artificial perspiration
 ISO 105-B08:1995 Part B08: Quality control of blue wool reference materials 1 to 7
 ISO 105-B10:2011 Part B10: Artificial weathering — Exposure to filtered xenon-arc radiation
 ISO 105-C01:1989 Part C01: Colour fastness to washing: Test 1 [Withdrawn: replaced with ISO 105-C10]
 ISO 105-C02:1989 Part C02: Colour fastness to washing: Test 2 [Withdrawn: replaced with ISO 105-C10]
 ISO 105-C03:1989 Part C03: Colour fastness to washing: Test 3 [Withdrawn: replaced with ISO 105-C10]
 ISO 105-C04:1989 Part C04: Colour fastness to washing: Test 4 [Withdrawn: replaced with ISO 105-C10]
 ISO 105-C05:1989 Part C05: Colour fastness to washing: Test 5 [Withdrawn: replaced with ISO 105-C10]
 ISO 105-C06:2010 Part C06: Colour fastness to domestic and commercial laundering
 ISO 105-C07:1999 Part C07: Colour fastness to wet scrubbing of pigment printed textiles
 ISO 105-C08:2010 Part C08: Colour fastness to domestic and commercial laundering using a non-phosphate reference detergent incorporating a low-temperature bleach activator
 ISO 105-C09:2001 Part C09: Colour fastness to domestic and commercial laundering — Oxidative bleach response using a non-phosphate reference detergent incorporating a low temperature bleach activator
 ISO 105-C10:2006 Part C10: Colour fastness to washing with soap or soap and soda
 ISO 105-C12:2004 Part C12: Colour fastness to industrial laundering
 ISO 105-D01:2010 Part D01: Colour fastness to drycleaning using perchloroethylene solvent
 ISO 105-D02:2016 Part D02: Colour fastness to rubbing: Organic solvents
 ISO 105-E01:2013 Part E01: Colour fastness to water
 ISO 105-E02:2013 Part E02: Colour fastness to sea water
 ISO 105-E03:2010 Part E03: Colour fastness to chlorinated water (swimming-pool water)
 ISO 105-E04:2013 Part E04: Colour fastness to perspiration
 ISO 105-E05:2010 Part E05: Colour fastness to spotting: Acid
 ISO 105-E06:2006 Part E06: Colour fastness to spotting: Alkali
 ISO 105-E07:2010 Part E07: Colour fastness to spotting: Water
 ISO 105-E08:1994 Part E08: Colour fastness to hot water
 ISO 105-E09:2010 Part E09: Colour fastness to potting
 ISO 105-E10:1994 Part E10: Colour fastness to decatizing
 ISO 105-E11:1994 Part E11: Colour fastness to steaming
 ISO 105-E12:2010 Part E12: Colour fastness to milling: Alkaline milling
 ISO 105-E13:1994 Part E13: Colour fastness to acid-felting: Severe
 ISO 105-E14:1994 Part E14: Colour fastness to acid-felting: Mild
 ISO 105-E16:2006 Part E16: Colour fastness to water spotting on upholstery fabrics
 ISO 105-F01:2001 Part F01: Specification for wool adjacent fabric
 ISO 105-F02:2009 Part F02: Specification for cotton and viscose adjacent fabrics
 ISO 105-F03:2001 Part F03: Specification for polyamide adjacent fabric
 ISO 105-F04:2001 Part F04: Specification for polyester adjacent fabric
 ISO 105-F05:2001 Part F05: Specification for acrylic adjacent fabric
 ISO 105-F06:2000 Part F06: Specification for silk adjacent fabric
 ISO 105-F07:2001 Part F07: Specification for secondary acetate adjacent fabric
 ISO 105-F09:2009 Part F09: Specification for cotton rubbing cloth
 ISO 105-F10:1989 Part F10: Specification for adjacent fabric: Multifibre
 ISO 105-G01:2016 Part G01: Colour fastness to nitrogen oxides
 ISO 105-G02:1993 Part G02: Colour fastness to burnt-gas fumes
 ISO 105-G03:1993 Part G03: Colour fastness to ozone in the atmosphere
 ISO 105-G04:2016 Part G04: Colour fastness to oxides of nitrogen in the atmosphere at high humidities
 ISO 105-J01:1997 Part J01: General principles for measurement of surface colour
 ISO 105-J02:1997 Part J02: Instrumental assessment of relative whiteness
 ISO 105-J03:2009 Part J03: Calculation of colour differences
 ISO 105-J05:2007 Part J05: Method for the instrumental assessment of the colour inconstancy of a specimen with change in illuminant (CMCCON02)
 ISO 105-N01:1993 Part N01: Colour fastness to bleaching: Hypochlorite
 ISO 105-N02:1993 Part N02: Colour fastness to bleaching: Peroxide
 ISO 105-N03:1993 Part N03: Colour fastness to bleaching: Sodium chlorite (mild)
 ISO 105-N04:1993 Part N04: Colour fastness to bleaching: Sodium chlorite (severe)
 ISO 105-N05:1993 Part N05: Colour fastness to stoving
 ISO 105-P01:1993 Part P01: Colour fastness to dry heat (excluding pressing)
 ISO 105-P02:2002 Part P02: Colour fastness to pleating: Steam pleating
 ISO 105-S01:1993 Part S01: Colour fastness to vulcanization: Hot air
 ISO 105-S02:1993 Part S02: Colour fastness to vulcanization: Sulfur monochloride
 ISO 105-S03:1993 Part S03: Colour fastness to vulcanization: Open steam
 ISO 105-X01:1993 Part X01: Colour fastness to carbonizing: Aluminium chloride
 ISO 105-X02:1993 Part X02: Colour fastness to carbonizing: Sulfuric acid
 ISO 105-X03:1987 Part X03: Colour fastness to chlorination [Withdrawn without replacement]
 ISO 105-X04:1994 Part X04: Colour fastness to mercerizing
 ISO 105-X05:1994 Part X05: Colour fastness to organic solvents
 ISO 105-X06:1994 Part X06: Colour fastness to soda boiling
 ISO 105-X07:1994 Part X07: Colour fastness to cross-dyeing: Wool
 ISO 105-X08:1994 Part X08: Colour fastness to degumming
 ISO 105-X09:1993 Part X09: Colour fastness to formaldehyde
 ISO 105-X10:1993 Part X10: Assessment of migration of textile colours into polyvinyl chloride coatings
 ISO 105-X11:1994 Part X11: Colour fastness to hot pressing
 ISO 105-X12:2016 Part X12: Colour fastness to rubbing
 ISO 105-X13:1994 Part X13: Colour fastness of wool dyes to processes using chemical means for creasing, pleating and setting
 ISO 105-X14:1994 Part X14: Colour fastness to acid chlorination of wool: Sodium dichloroisocyanurate
 ISO 105-X16:2016 Part X16: Colour fastness to rubbing — Small areas
 ISO 105-X18:2007 Part X18: Assessment of the potential to phenolic yellowing of materials
 ISO 105-X19:2020 Part X19: Colour fastness to rubbing (Gakushin test method)
 ISO 105-Z01:1993 Part Z01: Colour fastness to metals in the dye-bath: Chromium salts
 ISO 105-Z02:1993 Part Z02: Colour fastness to metals in the dye-bath: Iron and copper
 ISO 105-Z03:1996 Part Z03: Intercompatibility of basic dyes for acrylic fibres
 ISO 105-Z04:1995 Part Z04: Dispersibility of disperse dyes
 ISO 105-Z05:1996 Part Z05: Determination of the dusting behaviour of dyes
 ISO 105-Z06:1998 Part Z06: Evaluation of dye and pigment migration
 ISO 105-Z07:1995 Part Z07: Determination of application solubility and solution stability of water-soluble dyes
 ISO 105-Z08:1995 Part Z08: Determination of solubility and solution stability of reactive dyes in the presence of electrolytes
 ISO 105-Z09:1995 Part Z09: Determination of cold water solubility of water-soluble dyes
 ISO 105-Z10:1997 Part Z10: Determination of relative colour strength of dyes in solution
 ISO 105-Z11:1998 Part Z11: Evaluation of speckiness of colorant dispersions
 ISO/R 106:1959 Shipbuilding — Light metal rivets — Diameters and clearances [Withdrawn without replacement]
 ISO/R 107:1959 Shipbuilding — Light metal rivets — Ship heads [Withdrawn without replacement]
 ISO 108:1976 Textile machinery and accessories — Weaving looms — Definition of left and right sides
 ISO 109:1982 Textile machinery — Working widths of weaving machines
 ISO 110:1978 Textile machinery and accessories — Cones for yarn winding (cross wound) — Half angle of the cone 9 degrees 15' [Withdrawn without replacement]
 ISO 111:1978 Textile machinery and accessories — Cones for yarn winding (cross wound) — Half angle of the cone 4 degrees 20' [Withdrawn: Replaced with ISO 8489-3]
 ISO 112:1983 Textile machinery and accessories — Cones for yarn winding (cross wound) — Half angle of the cone 3 degrees 30' [Withdrawn: Replaced with ISO 8489-2]
 ISO 113:2010 Rolling bearings — Plummer block housings — Boundary dimensions
 ISO 114:1980 Unalloyed magnesium ingots — Chemical composition [Withdrawn: replaced with ISO 8287]
 ISO 115:2003 Unalloyed aluminium ingots for remelting — Classification and composition
 ISO/R 116:1959 Pesticides — Common names — First series of terms [Withdrawn: replaced with ISO 1750]
 ISO/R 117:1959 Plastics — Polystyrene — Determination of boiling water absorption [Withdrawn: replaced with ISO 62]
 ISO 118:1976 Plastics — Polystyrene — Determination of methanol-soluble matter  [Withdrawn without replacement]
 ISO 119:1977 Plastics — Phenol-formaldehyde mouldings — Determination of free phenols — Iodometric method
 ISO 120:1977 Plastics — Phenol-formaldehyde mouldings — Determination of free ammonia and ammonium compounds — Colorimetric comparison method
 ISO 121:1980 Magnesium-aluminium-zinc alloy ingots and alloy castings — Chemical composition and mechanical properties of sand cast reference test bars [Withdrawn: replaced with ISO 16220]
 ISO/R 122:1959 Composition of magnesium-aluminium-zinc alloy ingots for casting purposes [Withdrawn: replaced with ISO 121, and later ISO 16220]
 ISO 123:2001 Rubber latex — Sampling
 ISO 124:2014 Latex, rubber — Determination of total solids content
 ISO 125:2020 Natural rubber latex concentrate — Determination of alkalinity
 ISO 126:2005 Natural rubber latex concentrate — Determination of dry rubber content
 ISO 127:2018 Rubber, natural latex concentrate — Determination of KOH number
 ISO 128 Technical product documentation — General principles of representation
 ISO 129 Technical product documentation — Indication of dimensions and tolerances
 ISO 129-1:2018 Part 1: General principles
 ISO 129-4:2013 Part 4: Dimensioning of shipbuilding drawings
 ISO 129-5:2018 Part 5: Dimensioning of structural metal work
 ISO/R 130:1959 Aircraft — Colour identification of mechanical control circuits [Withdrawn without replacement]
 ISO 131:1979 Acoustics — Expression of physical and subjective magnitudes of sound or noise in air [Withdrawn without replacement]
 ISO 132:2017 Rubber, vulcanized or thermoplastic — Determination of flex cracking and crack growth (De Mattia)
 ISO 133:1983 Rubber, vulcanized — Determination of crack growth (De Mattia) [Withdrawn: replaced with ISO 132]
 ISO 134:1973 Plain end steel tubes for general purposes [Withdrawn: replaced with ISO 4200]
 ISO/R 135:1959 Paper vocabulary — Second series of terms [Withdrawn: replaced with ISO 4046]
 ISO 136:1972 Steel — Simple torsion testing of wire [Withdrawn: replaced with ISO 7800]
 ISO 137:2015 Wool — Determination of fibre diameter — Projection microscope method
 ISO/R 138:1960 Textiles — Universal yarn count system [Withdrawn: replaced with ISO 1144]
 ISO 139:2005 Textiles — Standard atmospheres for conditioning and testing
 ISO 140 Acoustics — Measurement of sound insulation in buildings and of building elements
 ISO 140-1:1997 Part 1: Requirements for laboratory test facilities with suppressed flanking transmission [Withdrawn: replaced with ISO 10140-(1–5)]
 ISO 140-2:1991 Part 2: Determination, verification and application of precision data [Withdrawn: replaced with ISO 12999-1:2014]
 ISO 140-3:1995 Part 3: Laboratory measurements of airborne sound insulation of building elements [Withdrawn: replaced with ISO 10140-(1–5)]
 ISO 140-4:1998 Part 4: Field measurements of airborne sound insulation between rooms [Withdrawn: replaced with ISO 16283-1:2014]
 ISO 140-5:1998 Part 5: Field measurements of airborne sound insulation of façade elements and façades [Withdrawn: replaced with ISO 16283-(1,3):2014]
 ISO 140-6:1998 Part 6: Laboratory measurements of impact sound insulation of floors [Withdrawn: replaced with ISO 10140-(1–5)]
 ISO 140-7:1998 Part 7: Field measurements of impact sound insulation of floors [Withdrawn: replaced with ISO 16283-(1–2)]
 ISO 140-8:1997 Part 8: Laboratory measurements of the reduction of transmitted impact noise by floor coverings on a heavyweight standard floor [Withdrawn: replaced with ISO 10140-(1–5)]
 ISO 140-9:1985 Part 9: Laboratory measurement of room-to-room airborne sound insulation of a suspended ceiling with a plenum above it [Withdrawn: replaced with ISO 10848-2]
 ISO 140-10:1991 Part 10: Laboratory measurement of airborne sound insulation of small building elements [Withdrawn: replaced with ISO 10140-(1–5)]
 ISO 140-11:1991 Part 11: Laboratory measurements of the reduction of transmitted impact sound by floor coverings on lightweight reference floors [Withdrawn: replaced with ISO 10140-(1–5)]
 ISO 140-12:2000 Part 12: Laboratory measurement of room-to-room airborne and impact sound insulation of an access floor [Withdrawn: replaced with ISO 10848-2]
 ISO/TR 140-13:1997 Part 13: Guidelines [Withdrawn: replaced with ISO 140-14]
 ISO 140-14:2004 Part 14: Guidelines for special situations in the field [Withdrawn: replaced with ISO 16283-1:2014]
 ISO 140-16:2006 Part 16: Laboratory measurement of the sound reduction index improvement by additional lining [Withdrawn: replaced with ISO 10140-(1–5)]
 ISO 140-18:2006 Part 18: Laboratory measurement of sound generated by rainfall on building elements [Withdrawn: replaced with ISO 10140-(1,5):2016]
 ISO 141:1976 Textile machinery and accessories — Pirn winders and cross winders — Definition of left and right sides
 ISO 142:1976 Textile machinery and accessories — Weaving preparatory machines — Definition of left and right sides
 ISO 143:1977 Textile machinery and accessories — Weft pirns for automatic looms [Withdrawn without replacement]
 ISO 144:1973 Steel — Reverse bend testing of wire [Withdrawn: replaced with ISO 7801]
 ISO/R 145:1960 Steel — Wrapping test for wire [Withdrawn: replaced with ISO 7802]
 ISO 146:1984 Metallic materials — Hardness test — Verification of Vickers hardness testing machines HV 0,2 to HV 100 [Withdrawn: replaced with ISO 6507-2]
 ISO 146-2:1993 Metallic materials — Verification of Vickers hardness testing machines — Part 2: Less than HV 0,2 [Withdrawn: replaced with ISO 6507-2]
 ISO/R 147:1960 Load calibration of testing machines for tensile testing of steel [Withdrawn: replaced with ISO 7500-1]
 ISO 148 Metallic materials — Charpy pendulum impact test
 ISO 148-1:2016 Part 1: Test method
 ISO 148-2:2016 Part 2: Verification of testing machines
 ISO 148-3:2016 Part 3: Preparation and characterization of Charpy V-notch test pieces for indirect verification of pendulum impact machines
 ISO/R 149:1960 Modified Erichsen cupping test for steel sheet and strip [Withdrawn: replaced with ISO 8490]
 ISO 150:2018 Raw, refined and boiled linseed oil for paints and varnishes — Specifications and methods of test
 ISO 151:1974 Shipbuilding details — Marking of hatchway beams [Withdrawn without replacement]
 ISO/R 152:1960 Shipbuilding details — Marking of wooden hatchway covers [Withdrawn without replacement]
 ISO/R 153:1960 Shipbuilding details — Ordinary Glasses for scuttles and lights — Dimensions [Withdrawn without replacement]
 ISO/R 154: Shipbuilding details — Marking of rolled, drawn and extruded products in light metals or in light alloys [Withdrawn without replacement]
 ISO 155:2019 Belt drives — Pulleys — Limiting values for adjustment of centres
 ISO 156:1982 Metallic materials — Hardness test — Verification of Brinell hardness testing machines [Withdrawn: replaced with ISO 6506-2]
 ISO 157:1996 Coal — Determination of forms of sulfur
 ISO/R 158:1960 Coal — Determination of ash [Withdrawn: replaced with ISO 1171]
 ISO/R 159:1960 Coal — Determination of total sulfur by the Strambi method [Withdrawn without replacement]
 ISO 160:1980 Asbestos-cement pressure pipes and joints [Withdrawn without replacement]
 ISO 161 Thermoplastics pipes for the conveyance of fluids — Nominal outside diameters and nominal pressures
 ISO 161-1:2018 Part 1: Metric series
 ISO 161-2:1996 Part 2: Inch-based series
 ISO 162:1985 Cinematography — Head gaps and sound records for three-, four-, or six-track magnetic sound records on 35 mm and single-track on 17,5 mm motion-picture film containing no picture — Positions and width dimensions
 ISO/R 163:1960 Cinematography — Magnetic striping of 16 mm film perforated along both edges [Withdrawn without replacement]
 ISO/R 164:1960 Aluminium and aluminium alloys — Castings — Chemical composition [Withdrawn: replaced with ISO 3522]
 ISO/R 165:1960 Metallic materials — Steel tubes — Flanging test [Withdrawn: replaced with ISO 8494]
 ISO/R 166:1960 Metallic materials — Steel tubes — Drift expanding test  [Withdrawn: replaced with ISO 8493]
 ISO/R 167:1960 Metallic materials — Steel tubes — Bend test [Withdrawn: replaced with ISO 8491]
 ISO/R 168:1960 Stretchers [Withdrawn without replacement]
 ISO/R 169:1960 Sizes of photocopies (on paper) readable without optical devices [Withdrawn without replacement]
 ISO/R 170:1960 Shipbuilding — Anchor Chains — Stud links [Withdrawn: replaced with ISO 1704]
 ISO 171:1980 Plastics — Determination of bulk factor of moulding materials
 ISO 172:1978 Plastics — Phenol-formaldehyde mouldings — Detection of free ammonia
 ISO/R 173:1961 Plastics — Determination of the percentage of styrene in polystyrene with Wijs solution [Withdrawn without replacement]
 ISO 174:1974 Plastics — Homopolymer and copolymer resins of vinyl chloride — Determination of viscosity number in dilute solution [Withdrawn: replaced with ISO 1628-2]
 ISO 175:2010 Plastics — Methods of test for the determination of the effects of immersion in liquid chemicals
 ISO 176:2005 Plastics — Determination of loss of plasticizers — Activated carbon method
 ISO 177:2016 Plastics — Determination of migration of plasticizers
 ISO 178:2019 Plastics — Determination of flexural properties
 ISO 179 Plastics — Determination of Charpy impact properties
 ISO 179-1:2010 Part 1: Non-instrumented impact test
 ISO 179-2:2020 Part 2: Instrumented impact test
 ISO 180:2019 Plastics — Determination of Izod impact strength
 ISO 181:1981 Plastics — Determination of flammability characteristics of rigid plastics in the form of small specimens in contact with an incandescent rod [Withdrawn without replacement]
 ISO 182 Plastics — Determination of the tendency of compounds and products based on vinyl chloride homopolymers and copolymers to evolve hydrogen chloride and any other acidic products at elevated temperatures
 ISO 182-1:1990 Part 1: Congo red method
 ISO 182-2:1990 Part 2: pH method
 ISO 182-3:1993 Part 3: Conductometric method
 ISO 182-4:1993 Part 4: Potentiometric method
 ISO 183:1976 Plastics — Qualitative evaluation of the bleeding of colorants [Withdrawn without replacement]
 ISO/R 184:1961 Grey cast irons — Brinell hardness test [Withdrawn without replacement]
 ISO 185:2020 Grey cast irons — Classification
 ISO 186:2002 Paper and board — Sampling to determine average quality
 ISO 187:1990 Paper, board and pulps — Standard atmosphere for conditioning and testing and procedure for monitoring the atmosphere and conditioning of samples
 ISO 188:2011 Rubber, vulcanized or thermoplastic — Accelerated ageing and heat resistance tests
 ISO/R 189:1961 Principles of operation of standards marks [Withdrawn without replacement]
 ISO/R 190:1961 Tensile testing of light metals and their alloys [Withdrawn: replaced with ISO 6892-1]
 ISO/R 191:1971 Brinell hardness test for light metals and their alloys [Withdrawn: replaced with ISO 6506-1 and ISO 6506-4]
 ISO/R 192:1971 Wickers hardness test for light metals and their alloys [Withdrawn: replaced with ISO 6507-1 and ISO 6507-4]
 ISO/R 193:1961 Microcopies on transparent bases: sizes of recommended bases [Withdrawn without replacement]
 ISO 194:1981 Plastics — List of equivalent terms [Withdrawn: replaced with ISO 472]
 ISO/R 195:1961 Copper and copper alloys — Drift expanding test [Withdrawn: replaced with ISO 8493]
 ISO 196:1978 Wrought copper and copper alloys — Detection of residual stress — Mercury(I) nitrate test
 ISO 197 Copper and copper alloys — Terms and definitions
 ISO 197-1:1983 Part 1: Materials
 ISO 197-2:1983 Part 2: Unwrought products (Refinery shapes)
 ISO 197-3:1983 Part 3: Wrought products
 ISO 197-4:1983 Part 4: Castings
 ISO 197-5:1980 Part 5: Methods of processing and treatment
 ISO/R 198:1961 Double-deck flat pallets for through transit of goods [Withdrawn without replacement]
 ISO 199:2014 Rolling bearings — Thrust bearings — Geometrical product specification (GPS) and tolerance values

ISO 200 – ISO 499 
 ISO/R 200:1961 Rolling bearings — Tolerances — Definitions [Withdrawn: replaced with ISO 1132]
 ISO/R 201:1961 Rolling bearings — Radial internal clearance in unloaded radial groove type ball bearings with cylindrical bore [Withdrawn: replaced with ISO 5753]
 ISO/R 202:1961 Metallic materials — Steel tubes — Flattening Test [Withdrawn: replaced with ISO 8492]
 ISO/R 203:1961 Metallic materials — Interrupted uniaxial creep testing in tension — Method of test [Withdrawn without replacement]
 ISO 204:2018 Metallic materials — Uniaxial creep testing in tension — Method of test
 ISO/R 205:1961 Steel — Determination of proof stress and proving test at elevated temperature [Withdrawn: replaced with ISO 783, and later ISO 6892-2]
 ISO/R 206:1961 Steel — Creep stress rupture testing of at elevated temperatures [Withdrawn: replaced with ISO 204]
 ISO 207:1980 Magnesium and magnesium alloys — Unalloyed magnesium — Chemical composition [Withdrawn: replaced with ISO 8287]
 ISO/R 208:1961 Aluminium and aluminium alloys — Castings — Chemical composition (complement to ISO/R 164) [Withdrawn: replaced with ISO 3522]
 ISO 209:2007 Aluminium and aluminium alloys — Chemical composition
 ISO/TS 210:2014 Essential oils — General rules for packaging, conditioning and storage
 ISO/TS 211:2014 Essential oils — General rules for labelling and marking of containers
 ISO 212:2007 Essential oils — Sampling
 ISO 213:1982 Machine tools — Lathe tool posts — Overall internal height [Withdrawn without replacement]
 ISO 214:1976 Documentation — Abstracts for publications and documentation
 ISO 215:1986 Documentation — Presentation of contributions to periodicals and other serials
 ISO 216:2007 Writing paper and certain classes of printed matter — Trimmed sizes — A and B series, and indication of machine direction
 ISO 217:2013 Paper — Untrimmed sizes — Designation and tolerances for primary and supplementary ranges, and indication of machine direction
 ISO/R 218:1961 Scale of 35 mm microfilms for international exchange [Withdrawn without replacement]
 ISO/R 219:1961 Pesticides — Common names — Second series of terms [Withdrawn: replaced with ISO 1750]
 ISO/R 220:1961 Textile fibres — Some methods of sampling for testing [Withdrawn: replaced with ISO 1130]
 ISO 221:1976 Metallic materials — Steel tubes — Wall thicknesses [Withdrawn without replacement]
 ISO/R 222:1968 Aerospace — Characteristics of aircraft electrical systems [Withdrawn: replaced with ISO 1540]
 ISO 223:1975 Aircraft — Ground support electrical supplies — General requirements [Withdrawn: replaced with ISO 6858]
 ISO/TR 224:1998 Aircraft — Declaration of design and performance for aircraft equipment — Standard form [Withdrawn without replacement]
 ISO 225:2010 Fasteners — Bolts, screws, studs and nuts — Symbols and descriptions of dimensions
 ISO 226:2003 Acoustics — Normal equal-loudness-level contours
 ISO 227:1978 Textile machinery and accessories — Single box pickers for centre tip shuttles for automatic looms and related picking stick dimensions [Withdrawn without replacement]
 ISO 228 Pipe threads where pressure-tight joints are not made on the threads
 ISO 229:1973 Machine tools — Speeds and feeds
 ISO 230 Test code for machine tools
 ISO 230-1:2012 Part 1: Geometric accuracy of machines operating under no-load or quasi-static conditions
 ISO 230-2:2014 Part 2: Determination of accuracy and repeatability of positioning of numerically controlled axes
 ISO 230-3:2020 Part 3: Determination of thermal effects
 ISO 230-4:2005 Part 4: Circular tests for numerically controlled machine tools
 ISO 230-5:2000 Part 5: Determination of the noise emission
 ISO 230-6:2002 Part 6: Determination of positioning accuracy on body and face diagonals (Diagonal displacement tests)
 ISO 230-7:2015 Part 7: Geometric accuracy of axes of rotation
 ISO/TR 230-8:2010 Part 8: Vibrations
 ISO/TR 230-9:2005 Part 9: Estimation of measurement uncertainty for machine tool tests according to series ISO 230, basic equations
 ISO 230-10:2016 Part 10: Determination of the measuring performance of probing systems of numerically controlled machine tools
 ISO/TR 230-11:2018 Part 11: Measuring instruments suitable for machine tool geometry tests
 ISO/R 231:1961 Paper vocabulary — Third series of terms [Withdrawn: replaced with ISO 4046]
 ISO/R 232:1961 Straight-sides splines and gauges — Dimensions in inches [Withdrawn without replacement]
 ISO 233 Information and documentation — Transliteration of Arabic characters into Latin characters
 ISO 234 Files and rasps
 ISO 234-1:1983 Part 1: Dimensions
 ISO 234-2:1982 Part 2: Characteristics of cut
 ISO 235:2016 Parallel shank jobber and stub series drills and Morse taper shank drills
 ISO 236 Reamers
 ISO 236-1:1976 Hand reamers
 ISO 236-2:2013 Part 2: Long fluted machine reamers with Morse taper shanks
 ISO 237:1975 Rotating tools with parallel shanks — Diameters of shanks and sizes of driving squares
 ISO 238:2016 Reduction sleeves and extension sockets for tools with Morse taper shanks
 ISO 239:1999 Drill chuck tapers
 ISO 240:2016 Milling cutters — Interchangeability dimensions for cutter arbors or cutter mandrels
 ISO 241:1994 Shanks for turning and planing tools — Shapes and dimensions of the section
 ISO 242:2014 Carbide tips for brazing on turning tools
 ISO 243:2014 Turning tools with carbide tips — External tools
 ISO 244:1979 Aircraft — Sealing wire
 ISO 245:1998 Aerospace — Lockwire — Diameters
 ISO 246:2007 Rolling bearings — Cylindrical roller bearings, separate thrust collars — Boundary dimensions
 ISO 247 Rubber — Determination of ash
 ISO 247-1:2018 Part 1: Combustion method
 ISO 247-2:2018 Part 2: Thermogravimetric analysis (TGA)
 ISO 248 Rubber, raw – Determination of volatile-matter content
 ISO 248-1:2011 Part 1: Hot-mill method and oven method
 ISO 248-2:2019 Part 2: Thermogravimetric methods using an automatic analyser with an infrared drying unit
 ISO 249:2016 Rubber, raw natural — Determination of dirt content
 ISO/R 250:1962 Rubber, raw natural — Sampling and preparation [Withdrawn: replaced with ISO 1795 and ISO 1796 (which was later replaced by ISO 1795)]
 ISO 251:2012 Conveyor belts with textile carcass — Widths and lengths
 ISO 252:2007 Conveyor belts — Adhesion between constitutive elements — Test methods
 ISO/R 253:1962 Belt drives — Grooved pulleys — sections Y and Z [Withdrawn: replaced with ISO 4183]
 ISO 254:2011 Belt drives — Pulleys — Quality, finish and balance
 ISO 255:1990 Belt drives — Pulleys for V-belts (system based on datum width) — Geometrical inspection of grooves
 ISO/R 256:1962 Belt drives — Section checking for V-belts [Withdrawn without replacement]
 ISO 257:2018 Pesticides and other agrochemicals — Principles for the selection of common names
 ISO/R 258:1961 Pesticides — Common names — Third series of terms [Withdrawn: replaced with ISO 1750]
 ISO 259 Information and documentation — Transliteration of Hebrew characters into Latin characters
 ISO/R 260:1962 Terms related to microcopies and their bases [Withdrawn without replacement]
 ISO 261:1998 ISO general purpose metric screw threads — General plan
 ISO 262:1998 ISO general purpose metric screw threads — Selected sizes for screws, bolts and nuts
 ISO 263:1973 ISO inch screw threads — General plan and selection for screws, bolts and nuts — Diameter range 0,06 to 6 in'
 ISO 264:1976 Unplasticized polyvinyl chloride (PVC) fittings with plain sockets for pipes under pressure — Laying lengths — Metric series [Withdrawn: replaced with ISO 1452-3]
 ISO 265 Pipes and fittings of plastics materials — Fittings for domestic and industrial waste pipes — Basic dimensions: Metric series
 ISO 265-1:1988 Part 1: Unplasticized poly(vinyl chloride) (PVC-U)
 ISO 266:1997 Acoustics — Preferred frequencies
 ISO/R 267:1962 Aircraft — Figures for instrument dials and number plates [Withdrawn without replacement]
 ISO 268:1980 Aircraft — Mechanical and electromechanical indicators — General requirements
 ISO 269:1985 Correspondence envelopes – Designation and sizes [Withdrawn without replacement]
 ISO 270:1975 Textile fibres — Determination of length by measuring individual fibres [Withdrawn: replaced with ISO 6989]
 ISO/R 271:1962 Textiles — Implementation of the Tex System for designating the size of fibres [Withdrawn: replaced with ISO 1144]
 ISO 272:1982 Fasteners — Hexagon products — Widths across flats
 ISO 273:1979 Fasteners — Clearance holes for bolts and screws
 ISO 274:1975 Copper tubes of circular section — Dimensions [Withdrawn without replacement]
 ISO/R 275:1962 Zinc Oxide for paints — Requirements and methods of test [Withdrawn without replacement]
 ISO 276:2019 Binders for paints and varnishes — Linseed stand oil — Requirements and methods of test
 ISO 277:2002 Binders for paints and varnishes — Raw tung oil — Requirements and methods of test
 ISO/R 278:1962 Essential oils — Standard layout for methods of analysis of essential oils [Withdrawn without replacement]
 ISO 279:1998 Essential oils — Determination of relative density at 20 degrees C – Reference method
 ISO 280:1998 Essential oils — Determination of refractive index
 ISO 281:2007 Rolling bearings — Dynamic load ratings and rating life
 ISO 282:1992 Conveyor belts — Sampling
 ISO 283:2015 Textile conveyor belts — Full thickness tensile strength, elongation at break and elongation at the reference load — Test method
 ISO 284:2012 Conveyor belts – Electrical conductivity – Specification and test method
 ISO/R 285:1962 Metallic materials — Steel tubes — Butt welding bends
 ISO 286 Geometrical product specifications (GPS) — ISO code system for tolerances on linear sizes
 ISO 286-1:2010 Part 1: Basis of tolerances, deviations and fits
 ISO 286-2:2010 Part 2: Tables of standard tolerance classes and limit deviations for holes and shafts
 ISO 287:2017 Paper and board — Determination of moisture content of a lot — Oven-drying method
 ISO/R 288
 ISO/R 288-1:1963 Part 1: Slotted and castle nuts with metric thread [Withdrawn without replacement]
 ISO/R 288-2:1969 Part 2: Slotted and castle nuts with metric thread 42 up to and including 100 mm thread diameter [Withdrawn without replacement]
 ISO 289 Rubber, unvulcanized — Determinations using a shearing-disc viscometer
 ISO 289-1:2015 Part 1: Determination of Mooney viscosity
 ISO 289-2:2020 Part 2: Determination of pre-vulcanization characteristics
 ISO 289-3:2015 Part 3: Determination of the Delta Mooney value for non-pigmented, oil-extended emulsion-polymerized SBR
 ISO 289-4:2003 Part 4: Determination of the Mooney stress-relaxation rate
 ISO/R 290:1961 Pesticides — Common names — Fourth series of terms [Withdrawn: replaced by ISO 1750]
 ISO 291:2008 Plastics — Standard atmospheres for conditioning and testing
 ISO/R 292:1967 Plastics — Determination of the melt mass-flow rate (MFR) and the melt volume-flow rate (MVR) of thermoplastics [Withdrawn: replaced by ISO 1133]
 ISO 293:2004 Plastics — Compression moulding of test specimens of thermoplastic materials
 ISO 294 Plastics — Injection moulding of test specimens of thermoplastic materials
 ISO 294-1:2017 Part 1: General principles, and moulding of multipurpose and bar test specimens
 ISO 294-2:2018 Part 2: Small tensile bars
 ISO 294-3:2020 Part 3: Small plates
 ISO 294-4:2018 Part 4: Determination of moulding shrinkage
 ISO 294-5:2017 Part 5: Preparation of standard specimens for investigating anisotropy
 ISO 295:2004 Plastics — Compression moulding of test specimens of thermosetting materials
 ISO 296:1991 Machine tools — Self-holding tapers for tool shanks
 ISO 297:1988 7/24 tapers for tool shanks for manual changing
 ISO 298:1973 Machine tools — Lathe centres — Sizes for interchangeability
 ISO 299:1987 Machine tool tables — T-slots and corresponding bolts
 ISO/R 300 Rolling bearings — ISO identification code
 ISO/R 300-1:1963 Rolling bearings — ISO identification code for group I: Radial Ball and Rolling Bearings, group II: Thrust Ball and Rolling Bearings, and group III: Tapered Rolling Bearings, Metric Series [Withdrawn without replacement]
 ISO/R 300-2:1965 Rolling bearings — ISO identification code for group IV: Tapered Rolling Bearings, Inch Series [Withdrawn without replacement]
 ISO 301:2006 Zinc alloy ingots intended for castings
 ISO 302:2015 Pulps — Determination of Kappa number
 ISO 303:2002 Road vehicles — Installation of lighting and light signalling devices for motor vehicles and their trailers [Withdrawn without replacement]
 ISO 304:1985 Surface active agents — Determination of surface tension by drawing up liquid films
 ISO 305:2019 Plastics — Determination of thermal stability of poly(vinyl chloride), related chlorine-containing homopolymers and copolymers and their compounds — Discoloration method
 ISO 306:2013 Plastics — Thermoplastic materials – Determination of Vicat softening temperature (VST)
 ISO 307:2019 Plastics — Polyamides — Determination of viscosity number
 ISO 308:1994 Plastics — Phenolic moulding materials — Determination of acetone-soluble matter (apparent resin content of material in the unmoulded state)
 ISO/R 309 Manganese ores — Methods of sampling
 ISO/R 309-1:1963 Manganese ores — Methods of sampling — Part 1: Ore loaded in freight wagons [Withdrawn without replacement]
 ISO 310:1992 Manganese ores and concentrates — Determination of hygroscopic moisture content in analytical samples — Gravimetric method
 ISO/R 311:1963 Manganese ores and concentrates — Determination of silicon content [Withdrawn: replaced with ISO 5890]
 ISO 312:1986 Manganese ores — Determination of active oxygen content, expressed as manganese dioxide — Titrimetric method
 ISO/R 313:1963 Manganese ores and concentrates — Determination of total iron content [Withdrawn: replaced with ISO 7990]
 ISO 314:1981 Manganese ores — Determination of carbon dioxide content — Gravimetric method [Withdrawn without replacement]
 ISO 315:1984 Manganese ores and concentrates — Determination of nickel content — Dimethylglyoxime spectrometric method and flame atomic absorption spectrometric method
 ISO 316:1982 Manganese ores — Determination of cobalt content — Nitroso-R-salt photometric method [Withdrawn without replacement]
 ISO 317:1984 Manganese ores and concentrates — Determination of arsenic content — Spectrometric method
 ISO/R 318:1963 Manganese ores and concentrates — Determination of aluminium content [Withdrawn: replaced with  ISO 4295]
 ISO/R 319:1963 Manganese ores and concentrates — Determination of manganese content [Withdrawn: replaced with ISO 4298]
 ISO 320:1981 Manganese ores — Determination of sulphur content — Barium sulphate gravimetric methods and sulphur dioxide titrimetric method after combustion
 ISO/R 321:1963 Manganese ores and concentrates — Determination of phosphorus content [Withdrawn: replaced with ISO 4293]
 ISO/R 322:1978 Manganese ores and concentrates — Determination of copper content [Withdrawn: replaced with ISO 4294]
 ISO/R 323:1963 Manganese ores and concentrates — Determination of lead content [Withdrawn without replacement]
 ISO 324:1978 Textile machinery and accessories — Cones for cross winding for dyeing purposes — Half angle of the cone 4 degrees 20' [Withdrawn: replaced with ISO 8489-4]
 ISO/R 325:1963 Textile machinery and accessories — Wood cones for cross winding — Half angle of the cone 4 degrees 20' [Withdrawn without replacement]
 ISO/R 326:1963 Textile machinery and accessories — Wood cones for cross winding — Nominal half angle of the cone 5 degrees 57' [Withdrawn without replacement]
 ISO/R 327:1963 Textile machinery and accessories — Wood cones for cross winding — Half angle of the cone 3 degrees 30' [Withdrawn without replacement]
 ISO 328:1974 Picture postcards and lettercards — Size [Withdrawn without replacement]
 ISO/R 329:1963 Large pallets for through transit of goods [Withdrawn without replacement]
 ISO/R 330:1963 Thermoplastics pipes for the conveyance of fluids — Nominal outside diameters and nominal pressures — Inch-based series [Withdrawn: replaced with ISO 161-2]
 ISO 331:1983 Coal — Determination of moisture in the analysis sample — Direct gravimetric method [Withdrawn without replacement]
 ISO 332:1981 Coal — Determination of nitrogen — Macro Kjeldahl method [Withdrawn without replacement]
 ISO 333:1996 Coal — Determination of nitrogen — Semi-micro Kjeldahl method [Withdrawn without replacement]
 ISO 334:2020 Coal and coke — Determination of total sulfur — Eschka method
 ISO 335:1974 Hard coal — Determination of caking power — Roga test [Withdrawn without replacement]
 ISO 336:1976 Plain end steel tubes, welded and seamless — General table of dimensions and masses per unit length [Withdrawn: replaced with ISO 4200]
 ISO 337:1981 Road vehicles — 50 semi-trailer fifth wheel coupling pin — Basic and mounting/interchangeability dimensions
 ISO/R 338:1963 Lifeboats for less than one hundred people [Withdrawn without replacement]
 ISO/R 339:1963 Definition of terms appearing in ISO recommendations for oils and pigments [Withdrawn without replacement]
 ISO 340:2013 Conveyor belts — Laboratory scale flammability characteristics — Requirements and test method
 ISO 341:1976 Textile machinery and accessories — Cotton spinning machinery — Working width [Withdrawn without replacement]
 ISO 342:1983 Textile machinery and accessories — Worsted and woollen cards — Width of cylinder and width on the wire [Withdrawn without replacement]
 ISO/R 343:1963 Textile machinery and accessories —  Warp tubes for ring spinning and ring doubling spindles — inch dimensions, tolerances, and gauges [Withdrawn without replacement]
 ISO 344:1981 Textile machinery and accessories — Spinning machines — Flyer bobbins [Withdrawn without replacement]
 ISO/R 345:1963 Shipbuilding details — Tests on galvanized steel wire ropes [Withdrawn without replacement]
 ISO/R 346:1963 Shipbuilding details — Galvanized steel wire ropes [Withdrawn without replacement]
 ISO/R 347:1963 Shipbuilding details — Anchor chains- End shackles [Withdrawn without replacement]
 ISO 348:1981 Hard coal — Determination of moisture in the analysis sample — Direct volumetric method [Withdrawn without replacement]
 ISO 349:2020 Hard coal — Audibert-Arnu dilatometer test
 ISO/R 350:1963 Hard coal — Determination of chlorine by the bomb-combustion method [Withdrawn without replacement]
 ISO 351:1996 Solid mineral fuels — Determination of total sulfur — High temperature combustion method [Withdrawn without replacement]
 ISO 352:1981 Solid mineral fuels — Determination of chlorine — High temperature combustion method [Withdrawn without replacement]
 ISO 353:1975 Processed writing paper and certain classes of printed matter — Method of expression of dimensions [Withdrawn without replacement]
 ISO 354:2003 Acoustics — Measurement of sound absorption in a reverberation room
 ISO 355:2019 Rolling bearings — Tapered roller bearings — Boundary dimensions and series designations
 ISO 356:1996 Essential oils — Preparation of test samples
 ISO/R 357:1963 Acoustics — Expression of the physical magnitudes of sound or noise in air [Withdrawn: replaced with ISO 131, now withdrawn without replacement]
 ISO 358:1975 Cinematography — Maximum aspect ratio of projector aperture for projection of 35 mm non-anamorphic motion-picture film — Specifications [Withdrawn without replacement]
 ISO 359:1983 Cinematography — Projectable image area on 16 mm motion-picture prints — Dimensions and location
 ISO 360:1975 Cinematography — Recording and reproducing head gaps for four-track magnetic sound records on 35 mm motion-picture film containing no picture — Positions and width dimensions [Withdrawn: replaced with ISO 162]
 ISO 361:1975 Basic ionizing radiation symbol
 ISO 362 Measurement of noise emitted by accelerating road vehicles — Engineering method
 ISO 362-1:2015 Part 1: M and N categories
 ISO 362-2:2009 Part 2: L category
 ISO 362-3:2016 Part 3: Indoor testing M and N categories
 ISO 363 Textile machinery and accessories — Flat steel healds with closed end loops
 ISO 363-1:2006 Part 1: Dimensions of healds manufactured of rolled steel wire
 ISO 363-2:2006 Part 2: Dimensions of healds manufactured of hardened strip steel
 ISO 364:1983 Textile machinery and accessories — Twin wire healds for weaving machines with heald frames
 ISO 365:1982 Textile machinery and accessories — Twin wire healds with inset mail for Jacquard weaving
 ISO 366 Textile machinery and accessories — Reeds
 ISO 366-2:2009 Part 2: Dimensions and designation of metal reeds with plate baulk
 ISO 366-3:2009 Part 3: Dimensions and designation of metal reeds with double-spring baulk
 ISO 366-4:2005 Part 4: Dimensions and designation of plastic-bound metal reeds
 ISO 366-5:2006 Part 5: Dimensions and designation of profile capsules
 ISO 367:1976 Textile machinery and accessories — Metal reeds with plate baulk — Dimensions [Withdrawn: replaced with ISO 366-2]
 ISO 368:2017 Spinning preparatory, spinning and doubling (twisting) machinery — Tubes for ring-spinning, doubling and twisting spindles, taper 1:38 and 1:64
 ISO 369:2009 Machine tools — Symbols for indications appearing on machine tools
 ISO 370:1975 Toleranced dimensions — Conversion from inches into millimetres and vice versa [Withdrawn without replacement]
 ISO/R 371:1964 Terms relating to microcopy apparatus [Withdrawn without replacement]
 ISO/R 372:1964 Paper vocabulary — Fourth series of terms [Withdrawn: replaced with ISO 4046]
 ISO/R 373:1964 General principles for fatigue testing of metals [Withdrawn without replacement]
 ISO 374 Protective gloves against dangerous chemicals and micro-organisms
 ISO 374-1:2016 Part 1: Terminology and performance requirements for chemical risks
 ISO 374-2:2019 Part 2: Determination of resistance to penetration
 ISO 374-4:2019 Part 4: Determination of resistance to degradation by chemicals
 ISO 374-5:2016 Part 5: Terminology and performance requirements for micro-organisms risks
 ISO 375:1974 Steel — Tensile testing of tubes [Withdrawn: replaced with ISO 6892-1]
 ISO 376:2011 Metallic materials — Calibration of force-proving instruments used for the verification of uniaxial testing machines
 ISO 377:2017 Steel and steel products — Location and preparation of samples and test pieces for mechanical testing
 ISO 378:1980 Gymnastic equipment — Parallel bars [Withdrawn without replacement]
 ISO 379:1980 Gymnastic equipment — Horizontal bar [Withdrawn without replacement]
 ISO/R 380:1964 Gymnastic equipment — Rings [Withdrawn without replacement]
 ISO/R 381:1964 Gymnastic equipment — Vaulting horse and pommeled horse [Withdrawn without replacement]
 ISO/R 382:1964 Gymnastic equipment — Balancing Beam [Withdrawn without replacement]
 ISO 383:1976 Laboratory glassware — Interchangeable conical ground joints
 ISO 384:2015 Laboratory glass and plastics ware — Principles of design and construction of volumetric instruments
 ISO 385:2005 Laboratory glassware — Burettes
 ISO 386:1977 Liquid-in-glass laboratory thermometers — Principles of design, construction and use [Withdrawn without replacement]
 ISO 387:1977 Hydrometers — Principles of construction and adjustment
 ISO/R 388:1964 ISO metric series for basic thicknesses of sheet and diameters of wire [Withdrawn without replacement]
 ISO 389 Acoustics — Reference zero for the calibration of audiometric equipment
 ISO 389-1:2017 Part 1: Reference equivalent threshold sound pressure levels for pure tones and supra-aural earphones
 ISO 389-2:1994 Part 2: Reference equivalent threshold sound pressure levels for pure tones and insert earphones
 ISO 389-3:2016 Part 3: Reference equivalent threshold vibratory force levels for pure tones and bone vibrators
 ISO 389-4:1994 Part 4: Reference levels for narrow-band masking noise
 ISO 389-5:2006 Part 5: Reference equivalent threshold sound pressure levels for pure tones in the frequency range 8 kHz to 16 kHz
 ISO 389-6:2007 Part 6: Reference threshold of hearing for test signals of short duration
 ISO 389-7:2019 Part 7: Reference threshold of hearing under free-field and diffuse-field listening conditions
 ISO 389-8:2004 Part 8: Reference equivalent threshold sound pressure levels for pure tones and circumaural earphones
 ISO 389-9:2009 Part 9: Preferred test conditions for the determination of reference hearing threshold levels
 ISO 390:1993 Products in fibre-reinforced cement — Sampling and inspection
 ISO 391:1982 Building and sanitary pipes in asbestos-cement [Withdrawn without replacement]
 ISO 392:1986 Asbestos-cement pipe fittings for building and sanitary purposes
 ISO 393 Asbestos-cement products — Corrugated sheets and fittings for roofing and cladding
 ISO 393-1:1983 Asbestos-cement products — Part 1: Corrugated sheets and fittings for roofing and cladding [Withdrawn without replacement]
 ISO 393-2:1986 Asbestos-cement products — Part 2: Asbestos-cement-cellulose corrugated sheets and fittings for roofing and cladding [Withdrawn without replacement]
 ISO 393-3:1984 Asbestos-cement products — Part 3: Asymmetrical section corrugated sheets and fittings for roofing and cladding [Withdrawn without replacement]
 ISO 393-4:1986 Asbestos-cement products — Part 4: Trapezoidal section sheets for roofing and cladding [Withdrawn without replacement]
 ISO 393-5:1987 Asbestos-cement products — Part 5: Short corrugated and asymmetrical section sheets and fittings for roofing [Withdrawn without replacement]
 ISO/R 394:1964 Asymmetrical section corrugated sheets in asbestos-cement for roofing and cladding [Withdrawn without replacement]
 ISO 395:1983 Asbestos-cement slates [Withdrawn without replacement]
 ISO 396 Products in fibre reinforced cement
 ISO 396-1:1980 Part 1: Asbestos-cement flat sheets [Withdrawn without replacement]
 ISO 396-2:1980 Part 2: Silica-asbestos-cement flat sheets [Withdrawn without replacement]
 ISO 396-3:1980 Part 3: Cellulose-asbestos-cement flat sheets [Withdrawn without replacement]
 ISO/R 397:1964 Copper and copper alloys — Wire — Wrapping test  [Withdrawn: replaced with ISO 7802]
 ISO/R 398:1964 Copper and copper alloys — Bend test [Withdrawn: replaced with ISO 7438]
 ISO/R 399:1964 Copper and copper alloys — Vickers hardness test [Withdrawn: replaced with ISO 6507-1 and ISO 6507-4]
 ISO/R 400:1964 Copper and copper alloys — Tensile test [Withdrawn: replaced with ISO 6892-1]
 ISO/R 401:1964 Copper and copper alloys — Tubes of circular section — Tensile test [Withdrawn: replaced with ISO 6892-1]
 ISO/R 402:1964 Copper and copper alloys — Wire — Tensile test [Withdrawn: replaced with ISO 6892-1]
 ISO/R 403:1964 Copper and copper alloys — Brinell hardness test [Withdrawn: replaced with ISO 6506-1 and ISO 6506-4]
 ISO 404:2013 Steel and steel products — General technical delivery requirements
 ISO/R 405:1964 Aircraft — Tow bar attachment fittings — Interface requirements [Withdrawn: replaced with ISO 8267, and later ISO 8267-1 and ISO 8267-2]
 ISO 406:1987 Technical drawings — Tolerancing of linear and angular dimensions [Withdrawn: replaced with ISO 129-1 and ISO 14405-2]
 ISO 407:2004 Small medical gas cylinders — Pin-index yoke-type valve connections
 ISO/R 408:1964 Safety Colours [Withdrawn: replaced with ISO 3864-1]
 ISO 409 Metallic materials — Hardness test — Tables of Vickers hardness values for use in tests made on flat surfaces
 ISO 409-1:1982 Metallic materials — Hardness test — Tables of Vickers hardness values for use in tests made on flat surfaces — Part 1: HV 5 to HV 100 [Withdrawn: replaced with ISO 6507-1 and ISO 6507-4]
 ISO 409-2:1983 Metallic materials — Hardness test — Tables of Vickers hardness values for use in tests made on flat surfaces — Part 2: HV 0,2 to less than HV 5 [Withdrawn: replaced with ISO 6507-1 and ISO 6507-4]
 ISO 410:1982 Metallic materials — Hardness test — Tables of Brinell hardness values for use in tests made on flat surfaces [Withdrawn: replaced with ISO 6506-1 and ISO 6506-4]
 ISO/R 411:1964 Pesticides — Common names — Fifth series of terms [Withdrawn: replaced with ISO 1750]
 ISO 412:1976 Gum spirit of turpentine and wood turpentines for paints and varnishes [Withdrawn without replacement]
 ISO 413:1974 Aircraft — Heads of lubricating nipples
 ISO/R 414:1965 Aircraft — Tyre Valves [Withdrawn without replacement]
 ISO 415:1975 Envelopes, postcards and similar articles — Cancellation area [Withdrawn without replacement]
 ISO 416:1974 Picture postcards — Area reserved for the address [Withdrawn without replacement]
 ISO 417:1993 Photography — Determination of residual thiosulfate and other related chemicals in processed photographic materials — Methods using iodine-amylose, methylene blue and silver sulfide [Withdrawn: replaced with ISO 18917]
 ISO 418:2001 Photography — Processing chemicals — Specifications for anhydrous sodium sulfite
 ISO 419:1972 Photography — Processing chemicals — Specifications for sodium thiosulfate pentahydrate [Withdrawn: replaced with ISO 10636]
 ISO 420:1994 Photography — Processing chemicals — Specifications for potassium bromide
 ISO/R 421:1965 Photography — Processing chemicals — Method for indicating the stability of the images of processed black-and white films, plates, and papers [Withdrawn without replacement]
 ISO 422:1994 Photography — Processing chemicals — Specifications for p-methylaminophenol sulfate
 ISO 423:1994 Photography — Processing chemicals — Specifications for hydroquinone
 ISO 424:1994 Photography — Processing chemicals — Specifications for anhydrous sodium carbonate and sodium carbonate monohydrate
 ISO 425:1973 Photography — Sensitized materials — Quantity packaging [Withdrawn without replacement]
 ISO 426 Wrought copper-zinc alloys — Chemical composition and forms of wrought products
ISO 426-1:1983 Wrought copper-zinc alloys — Chemical composition and forms of wrought products — Part 1: Non-leaded and special copper-zinc alloys [Withdrawn without replacement]
ISO 426-2:1983 Wrought copper-zinc alloys — Chemical composition and forms of wrought products — Part 2: Leaded copper-zinc alloys [Withdrawn without replacement]
 ISO 427:1983 Wrought copper-tin alloys — Chemical composition and forms of wrought products [Withdrawn without replacement]
 ISO 428:1983 Wrought copper-aluminium alloys — Chemical composition and forms of wrought products [Withdrawn without replacement]
 ISO 429:1983 Wrought copper-nickel alloys — Chemical composition and forms of wrought products [Withdrawn without replacement]
 ISO 430:1983 Wrought copper-nickel-zinc alloys — Chemical composition and forms of wrought products [Withdrawn without replacement]
 ISO 431:1981 Copper refinery shapes [Withdrawn without replacement]
 ISO 432:1989 Ply type conveyor belts — Characteristics of construction [Withdrawn without replacement]
 ISO 433:2017 Conveyor belts — Marking
 ISO/R 434:1965 Y-section V-belts — Lengths [Withdrawn: replaced by ISO 4184]
 ISO 435:1975 Micrographics — ISO character — Description and use [Withdrawn: replaced by ISO 446]
 ISO/R 436:1965 Informative labelling [Withdrawn without replacement]
 ISO 437:1982 Steel and cast iron — Determination of total carbon content — Combustion gravimetric method [Withdrawn without replacement]
 ISO 438:1980 Paper — Determination of bulking thickness and apparent density [Withdrawn: replaced by ISO 534]
 ISO 439:2020 Steel and cast iron — Determination of silicon content — Gravimetric method
 ISO/R 440:1965 Aircraft — shape, size, and direction of operation of lever controls [Withdrawn without replacement]
 ISO 441:1997 Textile machinery and accessories — Drop wires for warp stop motions for weaving machines without automatic drawing-in
 ISO/R 442:1965 Verification of pendulum impact testing machines for testing steels [Withdrawn without replacement]
 ISO/R 443:1965 Aircraft — Marking of gas cylinders [Withdrawn without replacement]
 ISO 444:1981 Phlogopite mica blocks, thins and splittings — Grading by size [Withdrawn without replacement]
 ISO 445:2013 Pallets for materials handling — Vocabulary
 ISO 446:2004 Micrographics — ISO character and ISO test chart No. 1 — Description and use
 ISO 447:1984 Machine tools — Direction of operation of controls
 ISO 448:1981 Gas cylinders for industrial use — Marking for identification of content [Withdrawn without replacement]
 ISO 449:1997 Ships and marine technology — Magnetic compasses, binnacles and azimuth reading devices — Class A [Withdrawn: replaced with ISO 25862]
 ISO 450:1975 Aircraft — Connection for water of drinkable quality [Withdrawn: replaced with ISO 17775]
 ISO 451:1976 Aircraft — Pressure re-oiling connection
 ISO/R 452:1965 Essential characteristics of 35 mm microfilm ready apparatus [Withdrawn without replacement]
 ISO/R 453:1965 Surface active agents — Vocabulary — First list [Withdrawn: replaced with ISO 862]
 ISO 454:1975 Acoustics — Relation between sound pressure levels of narrow bands of noise in a diffuse field and in a frontally-incident free field for equal loudness [Withdrawn without replacement]
 ISO/R 455:1965 Analysis of soaps — Determination of total crude fatty acids [Withdrawn: replaced with ISO 685]
 ISO 456:1973 Surface active agents — Analysis of soaps — Determination of free caustic alkali
 ISO 457:1983 Soaps — Determination of chloride content — Titrimetric method
 ISO 458 Plastics — Determination of stiffness in torsion of flexible materials
 ISO 458-1:1985 Part 1: General method
 ISO 458-2:1985 Part 2: Application to plasticized compounds of homopolymers and copolymers of vinyl chloride
 ISO/R 459:1962 Narrow V-belts — Grooved pulleys — Groove sections SPZ, SPA, SPB [Withdrawn: replaced with ISO 4183]
 ISO/R 460:1962 Narrow V-belts — Lengths — Groove sections SPZ, SPA, SPB [Withdrawn: replaced with ISO 4184]
 ISO 461 Aircraft — Connectors for ground electrical supplies
 ISO 461-1:2003 Part 1: Design, performance and test requirements
 ISO 461-2:1985 Part 2: Dimensions
 ISO/R 462:1965 Plastics — Determination of the change of mechanical properties after contact with chemical substances [Withdrawn: replaced with ISO 175]
 ISO 463:2006 Geometrical Product Specifications (GPS) — Dimensional measuring equipment — Design and metrological characteristics of mechanical dial gauges
 ISO 464:2015 Rolling bearings — Radial bearings with locating snap ring — Dimensions, geometrical product specifications (GPS) and tolerance values
 ISO/R 465:1965 Rolling bearings — Double row self-aligning roller bearings — Radial internal clearance [Withdrawn: replaced with ISO 5753]
 ISO 466:1976 Cinematography — Image produced by 16 mm motion-picture camera aperture — Position and dimensions
 ISO/R 467:1966 Preferred modules and diametral pitches of cylindrical gears for general engineering [Withdrawn without replacement]
 ISO 468:1982 Surface roughness — Parameters, their values and general rules for specifying requirements [Withdrawn without replacement]
 ISO/R 469:1966 Aircraft — Conductors for general purpose aircraft electrical cables — Dimensions and characteristics [Withdrawn: replaced with ISO 2635]
 ISO/R 470:1966 Aircraft — Conductors for heat-resisting aircraft electrical cables — Dimensions and characteristics [Withdrawn: replaced with ISO 2635]
 ISO 471:1995 Rubber — Temperatures, humidities and times for conditioning and testing [Withdrawn: replaced with ISO 23529]
 ISO 472:2013 Plastics — Vocabulary
 ISO 473:2019 Lithopone pigments — General requirements and methods of testing
 ISO/R 474:1966 Aircraft — Conductors for general purpose aircraft electrical cables — Performance requirements [Withdrawn without replacement]
 ISO/R 475:1966 Rectangular refractory bricks — Dimensions [Withdrawn: replaced with ISO 5019-1]
 ISO 476:1982 Textile machinery and accessories — Pirn winding machines — Vocabulary
 ISO 477:1982 Textile machinery and accessories — Cone and cheese winding machines — Vocabulary
 ISO 478:1974 Paper — Untrimmed stock sizes for the ISO-A Series — ISO primary range [Withdrawn: replaced with ISO 217]
 ISO 479:1975 Paper — Untrimmed sizes — Designation and tolerances [Withdrawn: replaced with ISO 217]
 ISO/R 480:1966 Perforated metal cheese centres for bast fibre yearns [Withdrawn without replacement]
 ISO 481:1977 Textile machinery and accessories — Warper's beams — Terminology and main dimensions [Withdrawn: replaced with ISO 8116-2]
 ISO 482:1977 Aircraft — Propulsion units and components — Methods of numbering and describing direction of rotation [Withdrawn without replacement]
 ISO 483:2005 Plastics — Small enclosures for conditioning and testing using aqueous solutions to maintain the humidity at a constant value
 ISO 484 Shipbuilding — Ship screw propellers — Manufacturing tolerances
 ISO 484-1:2015 Part 1: Propellers of diameter greater than 2,50 m
 ISO 484-2:2015 Part 2: Propellers of diameter between 0,80 and 2,50 m inclusive
 ISO 485:1973 Aircraft water-methanol pressure connections
 ISO 486:1988 Cinematography — 16 mm motion-picture film perforated 8 mm Type R — Cutting and perforating dimensions
 ISO 487:1998 Steel roller chains, types S and C, attachments and sprockets
 ISO 488:2008 Milk — Determination of fat content — Gerber butyrometers [Withdrawn: replaced with ISO 19662]
 ISO 489:1999 Plastics — Determination of refractive index
 ISO 490:1993 Cinematography — Magnetic stripes and magnetic recording head gaps for sound record on 16 mm motion-picture film perforated along one edge (Type 1) — Positions and width dimensions
 ISO 491:2002 Cinematography — 35 mm motion-picture film and magnetic film — Cutting and perforating dimensions
 ISO 492:2014 Rolling bearings — Radial bearings — Geometrical product specifications (GPS) and tolerance values
 ISO 493:1975 Aircraft — Dimensions for single-hole mounting (Class 1 and Class 2) lever-operated manual switches
 ISO 494:2017 Cylindrical shank twist drills — Long series
 ISO 495:1966 Acoustics — Determination of sound power levels of noise sources [Withdrawn: replaced with ISO 3740, ISO 3741, ISO 3742, ISO 3743, ISO 3744, ISO 3745, and ISO 3746]
 ISO 496:1973 Driving and driven machines — Shaft heights [Withdrawn without replacement]
 ISO 497:1973 Guide to the choice of series of preferred numbers and of series containing more rounded values of preferred numbers
 ISO 498:1992 Natural rubber latex concentrate — Preparation of dry films
 ISO/R 499:1966 Paper — Internal diameters of cores of reels [Withdrawn without replacement]

ISO 500 – ISO 699 
 ISO 500 Agricultural tractors — Rear-mounted power take-off types 1, 2, 3 and 4
 ISO 501:2012 Hard coal — Determination of the crucible swelling number
 ISO 502:2015 Coal — Determination of caking power — Gray-King coke test
 ISO/R 503:1966 Wrought magnesium-aluminium-zinc alloys — Chemical composition [Withdrawn: replaced with ISO 3116]
 ISO 504:1975 Turning tools with carbide tips — Designation and marking
 ISO 505:2017 Conveyor belts — Method for the determination of the tear propagation resistance of textile conveyor belts
 ISO 506:2020 Rubber latex, natural, concentrate — Determination of volatile fatty acid number
 ISO/R 507:1970 Acoustics — Procedure for describing aircraft noise heard on the ground using frequency weighting [Withdrawn: replaced with ISO 3891]
 ISO/R 508:1966 Ships and marine technology — Identification colours for the content of piping systems [Withdrawn: replaced with ISO 14726-1, now ISO 14726]
 ISO 509:1996 Pallet trucks — Principal dimensions [Withdrawn without replacement]
 ISO 510:1977 Red lead for paints
 ISO 511:1977 White lead pigments for paints [Withdrawn without replacement]
 ISO 512:1979 Road vehicles — Sound signalling devices — Technical specifications [Withdrawn without replacement]
 ISO 513:2012 Classification and application of hard cutting materials for metal removal with defined cutting edges — Designation of the main groups and groups of application
 ISO 514:2014 Turning tools with carbide tips — Internal tools
 ISO 515:1973 Photography — Stereo systems using 35 mm objectives on 35 mm film, five-perforation format — Specifications [Withdrawn without replacement]
 ISO 516:2019 Camera shutters — Timing — General definition and mechanical shutter measurements
 ISO 517:2008 Photography — Apertures and related properties pertaining to photographic lenses — Designations and measurements
 ISO 518:2006 Photography — Camera accessory shoes, with and without electrical contacts, for photoflash lamps and electronic photoflash units — Specification
 ISO 519:1992 Photography — Hand-held cameras — Flash-connector dimensions
 ISO 520:2010 Cereals and pulses — Determination of the mass of 1 000 grains
 ISO 521:2011 Machine chucking reamers with cylindrical shanks and Morse taper shanks
 ISO 522:1975 Special tolerances for reamers
 ISO 523:1974 Milling cutters — Recommended range of outside diameters [Withdrawn without replacement]
 ISO/R 524:1966 Hard metal wire drawing dies — Interchangeability dimensions of pellets and cases [Withdrawn without replacement]
 ISO 525:2020 Bonded abrasive products — Shape types, designation and marking
 ISO/R 526:1966 Significance to purchasers of marks indicating conformitity with standards  [Withdrawn without replacement]
 ISO 527 Plastics — Determination of tensile properties
 ISO 527-1:2019 Part 1: General principles
 ISO 527-2:2012 Part 2: Test conditions for moulding and extrusion plastics
 ISO 527-3:2018 Part 3: Test conditions for films and sheets
 ISO 527-4:2021 Part 4: Test conditions for isotropic and orthotropic fibre-reinforced plastic composites
 ISO 527-5:2009 Part 5: Test conditions for unidirectional fibre-reinforced plastic composites
 ISO 528:1983 Refractory products — Determination of pyrometric cone equivalent (refractoriness)
 ISO 529:2017 Short machine taps and hand taps
 ISO 530:1975 Aircraft — General purpose push-pull single-pole circuit-breakers — Dimensions
 ISO/R 531:1966 Cast iron sanitary pipes and fittings for waste water and ventilation [Withdrawn without replacement]
 ISO 532 Acoustics — Methods for calculating loudness
 ISO 532-1:2017 Part 1: Zwicker method
 ISO 532-2:2017 Part 2: Moore-Glasberg method
 ISO/R 533:1966 Rolling bearings — Double row cylindrical roller bearings type with tapered bore 1:12 [Withdrawn without replacement]
 ISO 534:2011 Paper and board — Determination of thickness, density and specific volume
 ISO 535:2014 Paper and board — Determination of water absorptiveness — Cobb method
 ISO 536:2019 Paper and board — Determination of grammage
 ISO 537:1989 Plastics — Testing with the torsion pendulum [Withdrawn: replaced with ISO 6721-1, ISO 6721-2, ISO 6721-4, and ISO 6721-10]
 ISO/R 538:1967 Conventional signs to be used in the schemes for the installations of pipeline systems in ships [Withdrawn without replacement]
 ISO/R 539:1967 Acoustics — Dimensions and conductor resistance of heat-resisting  (260°C) electrical cables with copper conductors [Withdrawn without replacement]
 ISO 540:2008 Hard coal and coke — Determination of ash fusibility
 ISO/R 541:1967 Measurement of fluid flow by means of orifice plates and nozzles [Withdrawn: replaced with ISO 5167, later ISO 5167-1]
 ISO 542:1990 Oilseeds — Sampling [Withdrawn: replaced with ISO 21294]
 ISO 543:1990 Photography — Photographic films — Specifications for safety film [Withdrawn: replaced with ISO 18906]
 ISO 544:2017 Welding consumables — Technical delivery conditions for filler materials and fluxes — Type of product, dimensions, tolerances and markings
 ISO 545:1975 Filler rods, other than drawn or extruded, for welding — Lengths and tolerance [Withdrawn: replaced with ISO 544]
 ISO 546:1975 Drawn or extruded filler rods for welding, supplied in straight lengths — Lengths and tolerance [Withdrawn: replaced with ISO 544]
 ISO 547:1975 Electrodes for the welding of mild steel and low alloy high tensile steel — Lengths and tolerance [Withdrawn: replaced with ISO 544]
 ISO 548:1981 Manganese ores — Determination of barium oxide content — Barium sulphate gravimetric method
 ISO 549:1981 Manganese ores — Determination of combined water content — Gravimetric method
 ISO 550:1981 Manganese ores — Determination of titanium content [Withdrawn: replaced with ISO 7723]
 ISO 551:1975 Manganese ores — Determination of zinc content — Zinc mercurithyocyanate gravimetric method [Withdrawn without replacement]
 ISO 552:1975 Manganese ores and concentrates — Determination of calcium and magnesium contents [Withdrawn: replaced with ISO 6233]
 ISO 553:1981 Manganese ores — Determination of vanadium content — Titrimetric method and phosphotungstovanadate photometric method [Withdrawn without replacement]
 ISO 554:1976 Standard atmospheres for conditioning and/or testing — Specifications
 ISO 555 Liquid flow measurement in open channels — Dilution methods for measurement of steady flow
 ISO 555-1:1973 Liquid flow measurement in open channels — Dilution methods for measurement of steady flow — Part 1: Constant-rate injection method [Withdrawn without replacement]
 ISO 555-2:1987 Liquid flow measurement in open channels — Dilution methods for the measurement of steady flow — Part 2: Integration method [Withdrawn without replacement]
 ISO 556:2020 Coke (greater than 20 mm in size) — Determination of mechanical strength
 ISO/R 557:1967 Safety Signs [Withdrawn: replaced with ISO 3864-1]
 ISO 558:1980 Conditioning and testing — Standard atmospheres — Definitions
 ISO 559:1991 Steel tubes for water and sewage [Withdrawn without replacement]
 ISO 560:1975 Cold drawn precision steel tubes — Metric series — Dimensions and masses per metre [Withdrawn: replaced with ISO 4200]
 ISO 561:1989 Coal preparation plant — Graphical symbols
 ISO 562:2010 Hard coal and coke — Determination of volatile matter
 ISO 563:1981 Equipment for harvesting — Knife sections for agricultural cutter bars [Withdrawn without replacement]
 ISO/R 564:1967 Aerospace — Preformed flexible steel wire rope for aircraft controls — Dimensions and loads [Withdrawn: replaced with ISO 2020, later ISO 2020-1]
 ISO 565:1990 Test sieves — Metal wire cloth, perforated metal plate and electroformed sheet — Nominal sizes of openings
 ISO/R 566:1967 Pesticides — Common names — Sixth series of terms [Withdrawn: replaced with ISO 1750]
 ISO 567:1995 Coke — Determination of bulk density in a small container
 ISO 568:1976 Textile machinery and accessories — Heald frames for single or double row of healds — Designation of dimensions [Withdrawn: replaced with ISO 10787-1 and ISO 10787-2]
 ISO 569:1982 Textile machinery and accessories — Heald frames — Co-ordinated dimensions in relation to the pitch of the harness [Withdrawn: replaced with ISO 10787-1 and ISO 10787-2]
 ISO 570:1982 Textile machinery and accessories — Heald carrying rods for healds with closed "O"-shaped end loops
 ISO 571:1976 Textile machinery and accessories — Metal reeds with double-spring baulk — Dimensions [Withdrawn: Replaced with ISO 366-3]
 ISO 572:1976 Textile machinery and accessories — Shuttles for pirn changing automatic looms — Dimensions [Withdrawn without replacement]
 ISO 573:1976 Textile machinery and accessories — Dobby lags and pegs in wood, metal or other suitable material — Dimensions [Withdrawn without replacement]
 ISO 574:1979 Textile machinery and accessories — Perforated cylindrical tubes for cheese dyeing [Withdrawn: Replaced with ISO 3914-7]
 ISO 575:1978 Textile machinery and accessories — Transfer cones — Half angle of the cone 4 degrees 20' [Withdrawn without replacement]
 ISO 576:1976 Textile machinery and accessories — Paper patterns for dobbies — Dimensions [Withdrawn without replacement]
 ISO/R 577 Rolling bearings — Tapered rolling bearings — Metric series — Tolerances
 ISO/R 577-1:1967 Rolling bearings — Tapered rolling bearings — Metric series — Tolerances — Part 1: Normal tolerances [Withdrawn: Replaced with ISO 492]
 ISO/R 577-2:1968 Rolling bearings — Tapered rolling bearings — Metric series — Tolerances — Part 2: Tolerances classes 6 and 5 [Withdrawn: Replaced with ISO 492]
 ISO 577-3:1973 Rolling bearings — Tapered rolling bearings — Metric series — Tolerances — Part 3: Tolerances classes 4 [Withdrawn: Replaced with ISO 492]
 ISO 578:1987 Tapered roller bearings — Inch series — Tolerances [Withdrawn without replacement]
 ISO 579:2013 Coke — Determination of total moisture
 ISO 580:2005 Plastics piping and ducting systems — Injection-moulded thermoplastics fittings — Methods for visually assessing the effects of heating
 ISO/TR 581:2005 Weldability — Metallic materials — General principles
 ISO 582:1995 Rolling bearings — Chamfer dimensions — Maximum values
 ISO 583:2007 Conveyor belts with a textile carcass — Total belt thickness and thickness of constitutive elements — Test methods
 ISO 584:1982 Plastics — Unsaturated polyester resins — Determination of reactivity at 80 degrees C (conventional method)
 ISO 585:1990 Plastics — Unplasticized cellulose acetate — Determination of moisture content
 ISO/R 586:1967 Coke — Determination of ash [Withdrawn: replaced with ISO 1171]
 ISO 587:2020 Coal and coke — Determination of chlorine using Eschka mixture
 ISO/R 588 was incorporated into ISO/R 862
 ISO 589:2008 Hard coal — Determination of total moisture
 ISO 590:1981 Oil of brazilian sassafras [Withdrawn without replacement]
 ISO 591 Titanium dioxide pigments for paints
 ISO 591-1:2000 Part 1: Specifications and methods of test
 ISO 592:1998 Essential oils — Determination of optical rotation
 ISO 593:1974 Paper — Untrimmed stock sizes for the ISO-A Series — ISO supplementary range [Withdrawn: replaced with ISO 217]
 ISO 594 Conical fittings with a 6 % (Luer) taper for syringes, needles and certain other medical equipment
ISO 594-1:1986 Conical fittings with a 6 % (Luer) taper for syringes, needles and certain other medical equipment — Part 1: General requirements [Withdrawn: replaced with ISO 80369-7]
ISO 594-2:1998 Conical fittings with 6 % (Luer) taper for syringes, needles and certain other medical equipment — Part 2: Lock fittings [Withdrawn: replaced with ISO 80369-7]
 ISO 595 Reusable all-glass or metal-and-glass syringes for medical use [Withdrawn without replacement]
ISO 595-1:1986 Reusable all-glass or metal-and-glass syringes for medical use — Part 1: Dimensions [Withdrawn without replacement]
ISO 595-2:1987 Reusable all-glass or metal-and-glass syringes for medical use — Part 2: Design, performance requirements and tests [Withdrawn without replacement]
 ISO/R 596:1967 Hypodermic needles [Withdrawn without replacement]
 ISO/R 597:1967 Definitions and terminology of cements [Withdrawn without replacement]
 ISO/R 598:1967 Fundamental welding positions — Definitions and values of angles of slope and rotation for fillet welds for these positions [Withdrawn: replaced by ISO 6947]
 ISO 599:1985 Plastics — Polyamide homopolymers — Determination of matter extractable by boiling methanol [Withdrawn: replaced by ISO 6427]
 ISO/R 600:1967 Plastics — Polyamide homopolymers — Determination of the viscosity ratio in concentrated solution [Withdrawn without replacement]
 ISO 601:1981 Solid mineral fuels — Determination of arsenic content using the standard silver diethyldithiocarbamate photometric method of ISO 2590 [Withdrawn without replacement]
 ISO 602:2015 Coal — Determination of mineral matter
 ISO 603 Bonded abrasive products — Dimensions
 ISO 603-1:1999 Part 1: Grinding wheels for external cylindrical grinding between centres
 ISO 603-2:1999 Part 2: Grinding wheels for centreless external cylindrical grinding
 ISO 603-3:1999 Part 3: Grinding wheels for internal cylindrical grinding
 ISO 603-4:1999 Part 4: Grinding wheels for surface grinding/peripheral grinding
 ISO 603-5:1999 Part 5: Grinding wheels for surface grinding/face grinding
 ISO 603-6:1999 Part 6: Grinding wheels for tool and tool room grinding
 ISO 603-7:1999 Part 7: Grinding wheels for manually guided grinding
 ISO 603-8:1999 Part 8: Grinding wheels for deburring and fettling/snagging
 ISO 603-9:1999 Part 9: Grinding wheels for high-pressure grinding
 ISO 603-10:1999 Part 10: Stones for honing and superfinishings
 ISO 603-11:1999 Part 11: Hand finishing sticks
 ISO 603-12:1999 Part 12: Grinding wheels for deburring and fettling on a straight grinder
 ISO 603-13:1999 Part 13: Grinding wheels for deburring and fettling on a vertical grinder
 ISO 603-14:1999 Part 14: Grinding wheels for deburring and fettling/snagging on an angle grinder
 ISO 603-15:1999 Part 15: Grinding wheels for cutting-off on stationary or mobile cutting-off machines
 ISO 603-16:1999 Part 16: Grinding wheels for cutting-off on hand held power tools
 ISO 603-17:2014 Part 17: Spindle mounted wheels (ISO type 52)
 ISO 603-18:2013 Part 18: Grinding wheels for flat glass edge grinding machines
 ISO 604:2002 Plastics — Determination of compressive properties
 ISO 605:1991 Pulses — Determination of impurities, size, foreign odours, insects, and species and variety — Test methods
 ISO 606:2015 Short-pitch transmission precision roller and bush chains, attachments and associated chain sprockets
 ISO 607:1980 Surface active agents and detergents — Methods of sample division
 ISO/R 608:1967 Classical V-belts — Lengths (sections A, B, C, D, and E) [Withdrawn: replaced with ISO 4184]
 ISO 609:1996 Solid mineral fuels — Determination of carbon and hydrogen — High temperature combustion method
 ISO 610:1990 High-tensile steel chains (round link) for chain conveyors and coal ploughs
 ISO 611:2003 Road vehicles — Braking of automotive vehicles and their trailers — Vocabulary
 ISO 612:1978 Road vehicles — Dimensions of motor vehicles and towed vehicles — Terms and definitions
 ISO 613:2000 Ships and marine technology — Magnetic compasses, binnacles and azimuth reading devices — Class B [Withdrawn: replaced by ISO 25862]
 ISO 614:2012 Ships and marine technology — Toughened safety glass panes for rectangular windows and side scuttles — Punch method of non-destructive strength testing
 ISO/R 615:1967 Methods for determining the mechanical properties of the weld metal deposited by electrodes 3,15 mm or more in diameter [Withdrawn without replacement]
 ISO 616:1995 Coke — Determination of shatter indices
 ISO/R 617:1967 Calculation of rectangular symmetrical fillet welds statically loaded in such a way that the transverse section is not under any normal stress [Withdrawn without replacement]
 ISO 618:1974 Paper — Articles of stationery that include detachable sheets — Overall trimmed sizes [Withdrawn without replacement]
 ISO 619:1981 Manganese ores — Determination of chromium content — Diphenylcarbazide photometric method and silver persulphate titrimetric method
 ISO 620:1975 Manganese ores — Determination of zinc content — Polarographic method (zinc content between 0,005 and 0,1 %) [Withdrawn without replacement]
 ISO 621:1981 Manganese ores — Determination of metallic iron content (metallic iron content not exceeding 2 %) — Sulphosalicylic acid photometric method [Withdrawn without replacement]
 ISO 622:2016 Solid mineral fuels — Determination of phosphorus content — Reduced molybdophosphate photometric method
 ISO 623:1974 Paper and board — Folders and files — Sizes [Withdrawn without replacement]
 ISO 624:1974 Pulps — Determination of dichloromethane soluble matter [Withdrawn: replaced with ISO 14453]
 ISO 625:1996 Solid mineral fuels — Determination of carbon and hydrogen — Liebig method
 ISO/R 626:1967 Strength calculation of butt welded joints [Withdrawn without replacement]
 ISO/R 627:1967 Fundamental welding positions — Definitions and values of angles of slope and rotation for butt welds for these positions [Withdrawn: replaced by ISO 6947]
 ISO/R 628:1967 Pesticides — Common names — Seventh series of terms [Withdrawn: replaced with ISO 1750]
 ISO 629:1982 Steel and cast iron — Determination of manganese content — Spectrophotometric method
 ISO 630 Structural steels
 ISO 630-1:2011 Part 1: General technical delivery conditions for hot-rolled products
 ISO 630-2:2011 Part 2: Technical delivery conditions for structural steels for general purposes
 ISO 630-3:2012 Part 3: Technical delivery conditions for fine-grain structural steels
 ISO 630-4:2012 Part 4: Technical delivery conditions for high-yield-strength quenched and tempered structural steel plates
 ISO 630-5:2014 Part 5: Technical delivery conditions for structural steels with improved atmospheric corrosion resistance
 ISO 630-6:2014 Part 6: Technical delivery conditions for seismic-improved structural steels for building
 ISO 631:1975 Mosaic parquet panels — General characteristics
 ISO/R 632:1967 Methods of test for determining whether an electrode is a deep penetration electrode [Withdrawn without replacement]
 ISO 633:2019 Cork — Vocabulary
 ISO/R 634:1967 Aircraft — Methods of test for general purpose electrical cables with copper conductors [Withdrawn without replacement]
 ISO/R 635:1967 Welding consumables — Code of symbols for covered electrodes for arc welding of mild steels and low alloy high tensile steels [Withdrawn without replacement]
 ISO 636:2017 Welding consumables — Rods, wires and deposits for tungsten inert gas welding of non-alloy and fine-grain steels — Classification
 ISO 637:1975 Filler rods for gas welding of mild steels and low alloy high tensile steels — Determination of mechanical properties of deposited weld metal [Withdrawn without replacement]
 ISO 638 Paper, board, pulps and cellulosic nanomaterials — Determination of dry matter content by oven-drying method
 ISO 638-1:2021 Part 1: Materials in solid form
 ISO 638-2:2021 Part 2: Suspensions of cellulosic nanomaterials
 ISO 639 Codes for the representation of names of languages
 ISO 639-1:2002 Part 1: Alpha-2 code
 ISO 639-2:1998 Part 2: Alpha-3 code
 ISO 639-3:2007 Part 3: Alpha-3 code for comprehensive coverage of languages
 ISO 639-4:2010 Part 4: General principles of coding of the representation of names of languages and related entities, and application guidelines
 ISO 639-5:2008 Part 5: Alpha-3 code for language families and groups
 ISO 639-6:2009 Part 6: Alpha-4 code for comprehensive coverage of language variants [Withdrawn, no replacement]
 ISO 640:1984 Metallic materials — Hardness test — Calibration of standardized blocks to be used for Vickers hardness testing machines HV 0,2 to HV 100 [Withdrawn: replaced with ISO 6507-3]
 ISO 640-2:1993 Metallic materials — Calibration of standardized blocks to be used for Vickers hardness testing machines — Part 2: Less than HV 0,2 [Withdrawn: replaced with ISO 6507-3]
 ISO 641:1975 Laboratory glassware — Interchangeable spherical ground joints
 ISO 642:1999 Steel — Hardenability test by end quenching (Jominy test)
 ISO 643:2019 Steels — Micrographic determination of the apparent grain size
 ISO/R 644:1967 Conventional signs to be used in schemes for the installations of ventilation systems in ships [Withdrawn without replacement]
 ISO/R 645:1967 Statistics — Vocabulary and symbols — First series [Withdrawn: replaced with ISO 3534]
 ISO/IEC 646:1991 Information technology — ISO 7-bit coded character set for information interchange
 ISO 647:2017 Brown coals and lignites — Determination of the yields of tar, water, gas and coke residue by low temperature distillation
 ISO 648:2008 Laboratory glassware — Single-volume pipettes
 ISO 649 Laboratory glassware — Density hydrometers for general purposes
 ISO 649-1:1981 Part 1: Specification
 ISO 649-2:1981 Part 2: Test methods and use
 ISO 650:1977 Relative density 60/60 degrees F hydrometers for general purposes
 ISO 651:1975 Solid-stem calorimeter thermometers  [Withdrawn without replacement]
 ISO 652:1975 Enclosed-scale calorimeter thermometers  [Withdrawn without replacement]
 ISO 653:1980 Long solid-stem thermometers for precision use  [Withdrawn without replacement]
 ISO 654:1980 Short solid-stem thermometers for precision use  [Withdrawn without replacement]
 ISO 655:1980 Long enclosed-scale thermometers for precision use  [Withdrawn without replacement]
 ISO 656:1980 Short enclosed-scale thermometers for precision use  [Withdrawn without replacement]
 ISO 657 Hot-rolled steel sections
 ISO 658:2002 Oilseeds — Determination of content of impurities
 ISO 659:2009 Oilseeds — Determination of oil content (Reference method)
 ISO 660:2020 Animal and vegetable fats and oils — Determination of acid value and acidity
 ISO 661:2003 Animal and vegetable fats and oils — Preparation of test sample
 ISO 662:2016 Animal and vegetable fats and oils — Determination of moisture and volatile matter content
 ISO 663:2017 Animal and vegetable fats and oils — Determination of insoluble impurities content
 ISO 664:2008 Oilseeds — Reduction of laboratory sample to test sample
 ISO 665:2020 Oilseeds — Determination of moisture and volatile matter content
 ISO 666:2012 Machine tools — Mounting of grinding wheels by means of hub flanges
 ISO 667:1981 Rubber, compounded — Determination of cure rate — Shearing disk method [Withdrawn: replaced with ISO 289-2]
 ISO 668:2020  Series 1 freight containers — Classification, dimensions and ratings
 ISO 669:2016 Resistance welding — Resistance welding equipment — Mechanical and electrical requirements
 ISO/R 670:1968 Straight resistance spot welding electrodes — Mechanical and electrical requirements [Withdrawn: replaced with ISO 5184]
 ISO 671:1982 Steel and cast iron — Determination of sulphur content — Combustion titrimetric method
 ISO 672:1978 Soaps — Determination of moisture and volatile matter content — Oven method
 ISO 673:1981 Soaps — Determination of content of ethanol-insoluble matter
 ISO 674:1988 Metallic materials — Hardness test — Calibration of standardized blocks to be used for Rockwell hardness testing machines (scales A – B – C – D – E – F – G – H – K) [Withdrawn: replaced with ISO 6508-3]
 ISO 675:2014 Textiles — Woven fabrics — Determination of dimensional change on commercial laundering near the boiling point
 ISO 676:1995 Spices and condiments — Botanical nomenclature
 ISO 677:1976 Straight bevel gears for general engineering and heavy engineering — Basic rack
 ISO 678:1976 Straight bevel gears for general engineering and heavy engineering — Modules and diametral pitches
 ISO 679:2009 Cement — Test methods — Determination of strength
 ISO 680:1990 Cement — Test methods — Chemical analysis [Withdrawn: replaced with ISO 29581-1]
 ISO/R 681:1968 Chemical analysis of cements — Minor constituents of Portland cement [Withdrawn without replacement]
 ISO/R 682:1968 Chemical analysis of cements — Determination of sulphur as sulphide [Withdrawn without replacement]
 ISO 683 Heat-treatable steels, alloy steels and free-cutting steels
 ISO 683-1:2016 Part 1: Non-alloy steels for quenching and tempering
 ISO 683-2:2016 Part 2: Alloy steels for quenching and tempering
 ISO 683-3:2022 Part 3: Case-hardening steels
 ISO 683-4:2016 Part 4: Free-cutting steels
 ISO 683-5:2017 Part 5: Nitriding steels
 ISO 683-14:2004 Part 14: Hot-rolled steels for quenched and tempered springs
 ISO 683-15:1992 Part 15: Valve steels for internal combustion engines
 ISO 683-17:2014 Part 17: Ball and roller bearing steels
 ISO 683-18:2014 Part 18: Bright steel products
 ISO 684:1974 Analysis of soaps — Determination of total free alkali
 ISO 685:2020 Analysis of soaps — Determination of total alkali content and total fatty matter content
 ISO 686:1985 Photography — 35 mm filmstrips — Specifications for double-frame and single-frame formats [Withdrawn without replacement]
 ISO 687:2010 Solid mineral fuels — Coke — Determination of moisture in the general analysis test sample
 ISO 688:1975 Filler rods for braze welding — Determination of characteristics of deposited metal [Withdrawn without replacement]
 ISO 689:1975 Microcopying — ISO micromire — Description and use for checking a reading apparatus [Withdrawn without replacement]
 ISO 690:2010 Information and documentation — Guidelines for bibliographic references and citations to information resources
 ISO 691:2005 Assembly tools for screws and nuts — Wrench and socket openings — Tolerances for general use
 ISO 692:1982 Pulps — Determination of alkali solubility
 ISO 693:1982 Dimensions of seam welding wheel blanks
 ISO 694:2000 Ships and marine technology — Positioning of magnetic compasses in ships [Withdrawn: replaced by ISO 25862]
 ISO 695:1991 Glass — Resistance to attack by a boiling aqueous solution of mixed alkali — Method of test and classification
 ISO 696:1975 Surface active agents — Measurement of foaming power — Modified Ross-Miles method
 ISO 697:1981 Surface active agents — Washing powders — Determination of apparent density — Method by measuring the mass of a given volume
 ISO 698:1975 Filler rods for braze welding — Determination of conventional bond strength on steel, cast iron and other metals [Withdrawn without replacement]
 ISO 699:2015 Pulps — Determination of alkali resistance

ISO 700 – ISO 999 
 ISO 700:1982 Power sources for manual metal arc welding with covered electrodes and for the TIG process [Withdrawn: replaced by IEC 60974-1:1998, now withdrawn without replacement]
 ISO 701:1998 International gear notation — Symbols for geometrical data
 ISO 702 Machine tools — Connecting dimensions of spindle noses and work holding chucks
 ISO 702-1:2009 Part 1: Conical connection
 ISO 702-2:2007 Part 2: Camlock type
 ISO 702-3:2007 Part 3: Bayonet type
 ISO 702-4:2004 Part 4: Cylindrical connection
 ISO 703:2017 Conveyor belts — Transverse flexibility (troughability) — Test method
 ISO 704:2009 Terminology work — Principles and methods
 ISO 705:2015 Rubber latex — Determination of density between 5 degrees C and 40 degrees C
 ISO 706:2004 Rubber latex — Determination of coagulum content (sieve residue)
 ISO 707:2008 Milk and milk products — Guidance on sampling
 ISO/R 708:1968 Filler rods for gas welding — Test to determine the compatibility of steel filler rods and the parent metal in the welding of steels [Withdrawn without replacement]
 ISO 709:2001 Essential oils — Determination of ester value
 ISO 710 Graphical symbols for use on detailed maps, plans and geological cross-sections
 ISO 710-1:1974 Part 1: General rules of representation
 ISO 710-2:1974 Part 2: Representation of sedimentary rocks
 ISO 710-3:1974 Part 3: Representation of magmatic rocks
 ISO 710-4:1982 Part 4: Representation of metamorphic rocks
 ISO 710-5:1989 Part 5: Representation of minerals
 ISO 710-6:1984 Part 6: Representation of contact rocks and rocks which have undergone metasomatic, pneumatolytic or hydrothermal transformation or transformation by weathering
 ISO 710-7:1984 Part 7: Tectonic symbols
 ISO 711:1985 Cereals and cereal products — Determination of moisture content (Basic reference method) [Withdrawn without replacement]
 ISO 712:2009 Cereals and cereal products — Determination of moisture content — Reference method
 ISO 713:1975 Zinc — Determination of lead and cadmium contents — Polarographic method [Withdrawn without replacement]
 ISO 714:1975 Zinc — Determination of iron content — Photometric method
 ISO 715:1975 Zinc — Determination of lead content — Polarographic method [Withdrawn without replacement]
 ISO 716:1986 Metallic materials — Hardness test — Verification of Rockwell hardness testing machines (scales A – B – C – D – E – F – G – H – K) [Withdrawn: replaced with ISO 6508-2]
 ISO 717 Acoustics — Rating of sound insulation in buildings and of building elements
 ISO 717-1:2020 Part 1: Airborne sound insulation
 ISO 717-2:2020 Part 2: Impact sound insulation
 ISO 718:1990 Laboratory glassware — Thermal shock and thermal shock endurance — Test methods
 ISO 719:2020 Glass — Hydrolytic resistance of glass grains at 98 °C — Method of test and classification
 ISO 720:2020 Glass — Hydrolytic resistance of glass grains at 121 °C — Method of test and classification
 ISO 721:1991 Rock drilling equipment — Integral stems
 ISO 722:1991 Rock drilling equipment — Hollow drill steels in bar form, hexagonal and round
 ISO 723:1991 Rock drilling equipment — Forged collared shanks and corresponding chuck bushings for hollow hexagonal drill steels
 ISO 724:1993 ISO general-purpose metric screw threads — Basic dimensions
 ISO 725:2009 ISO inch screw threads — Basic dimensions
 ISO 726:1982 Metallic materials — Hardness test — Calibration of standardized blocks to be used for Brinell hardness testing machines [Withdrawn: replaced with ISO 6506-3]
 ISO 727 Fittings made from unplasticized poly(vinyl chloride) (PVC-U), chlorinated poly(vinyl chloride) (PVC-C) or acrylonitrile/butadiene/styrene (ABS) with plain sockets for pipes under pressure
 ISO 727-1:2002 Part 1: Metric series
 ISO 727-2:2005 Part 2: Inch-based series
 ISO 728:2021 Coke — Size analysis by sieving
 ISO 729:1988 Oilseeds — Determination of acidity of oils
 ISO 730:2009 Agricultural wheeled tractors — Rear-mounted three-point linkage — Categories 1N, 1, 2N, 2, 3N, 3, 4N and 4
 ISO 731 Formic acid for industrial use — Methods of test
 ISO 731-1:1977 Formic acid for industrial use — Methods of test — Part 1: General [Withdrawn without replacement]
 ISO 731-2:1977 Formic acid for industrial use — Methods of test — Part 2: Determination of total acidity — Titrimetric method [Withdrawn without replacement]
 ISO 731-3:1977 Formic acid for industrial use — Methods of test — Part 3: Determination of content of other acids — Potentiometric method [Withdrawn without replacement]
 ISO 731-4:1977 Formic acid for industrial use — Methods of test — Part 4: Visual limit test for inorganic chlorides [Withdrawn without replacement]
 ISO 731-5:1977 Formic acid for industrial use — Methods of test — Part 5: Visual limit test for inorganic sulphates [Withdrawn without replacement]
 ISO 731-6:1977 Formic acid for industrial use — Methods of test — Part 6: Determination of iron content — 2,2'- Bipyridyl photometric method [Withdrawn without replacement]
 ISO 731-7:1977 Formic acid for industrial use — Methods of test — Part 7: Determination of low contents of other volatile acids — Titrimetric method after distillation [Withdrawn without replacement]
 ISO 732:2000 Photography — 120-size and 220-size films — Dimensions
 ISO/R 733:1968 Hexagon bolts and nuts — Metric series — Tolerances on widths across flats, widths across corners [Withdrawn: replaced with ISO 4759-1]
 ISO 734:2015 Oilseed meals — Determination of oil content — Extraction method with hexane (or light petroleum)
 ISO 735:1977 Oilseed residues — Determination of ash insoluble in hydrochloric acid
 ISO 736:1977 Oilseed residues — Determination of diethyl ether extract [Withdrawn without replacement]
 ISO 737:1975 Coniferous sawn timber — Sizes — Methods of measurement
 ISO 738:2015 Coniferous sawn timber — Sizes — Permissible deviations and shrinkage [Withdrawn without replacement]
 ISO 739:1976 Sodium carbonate for industrial use — Preparation and storage of test samples
 ISO 740:1976 Sodium carbonate for industrial use — Determination of total soluble alkalinity — Titrimetric method
 ISO 741:1976 Sodium carbonate for industrial use — Determination of sodium hydrogen carbonate content — Titrimetric method [Withdrawn without replacement]
 ISO 742:1973 Sodium carbonate for industrial use — Determination of chloride content — Mercurimetric method [Withdrawn without replacement]
 ISO 743:1976 Sodium carbonate for industrial use — Determination of sulphate content — Barium sulphate gravimetric method
 ISO/R 744:1968 Sodium carbonate for industrial use — Determination of iron content — 2,2'- Bipyridyl photometric method [Withdrawn without replacement]
 ISO 745:1976 Sodium carbonate for industrial use — Determination of loss of mass and of non-volatile matter at 250 degrees C [Withdrawn without replacement]
 ISO 746:1976 Sodium carbonate for industrial use — Determination of matter insoluble in water at 50 degrees C
 ISO/R 747:1968 Sodium carbonate for industrial use — Expression of test results [Withdrawn without replacement]
 ISO 748:2021 Hydrometry — Measurement of liquid flow in open channels using current-meters or floats — Velocity  area methods using point velocity measurements
 ISO 749:1977 Oilseed residues — Determination of total ash
 ISO 750:1998 Fruit and vegetable products — Determination of titratable acidity
 ISO 751:1998 Fruit and vegetable products — Determination of water-insoluble solids
 ISO 752:2004 Zinc ingots
 ISO 753 Acetic acid for industrial use — Methods of test
 ISO 753-1:1981 Part 1: General [Withdrawn without replacement]
 ISO 753-2:1981 Part 2: Determination of acetic acid content — Titrimetric method [Withdrawn without replacement]
 ISO 753-3:1981 Part 3: Determination of formic acid content — Iodometric method [Withdrawn without replacement]
 ISO 753-4:1981 Part 4: Determination of acetaldehyde monomer content — Titrimetric method [Withdrawn without replacement]
 ISO 753-5:1981 Part 5: Determination of total acetaldehyde content — Titrimetric method [Withdrawn without replacement]
 ISO 753-6:1981 Part 6: Determination of permanganate index [Withdrawn without replacement]
 ISO 753-7:1981 Part 7: Determination of dichromate index [Withdrawn without replacement]
 ISO 753-8:1981 Part 8: Visual limit test for inorganic chlorides [Withdrawn without replacement]
 ISO 753-9:1981 Part 9: Visual limit test for inorganic sulphates [Withdrawn without replacement]
 ISO 753-10:1981 Part 10: Visual limit test for heavy metals (including iron) [Withdrawn without replacement]
 ISO 754:1982 Acetic anhydride for industrial use — Methods of test [Withdrawn without replacement]
 ISO 755 Butan-1-ol for industrial use — Methods of test
 ISO 755-1:1981 Part 1: General [Withdrawn without replacement]
 ISO 755-2:1981 Part 2: Determination of acidity — Titrimetric method [Withdrawn without replacement]
 ISO 755-3:1981 Part 3: Sulphuric acid colour test [Withdrawn without replacement]
 ISO 756 Propan-2-ol for industrial use — Methods of test
 ISO 756-1:1981 Part 1: General
 ISO 756-2:1981 Part 2: Determination of acidity — Titrimetric method [Withdrawn without replacement]
 ISO 756-3:1981 Part 3: Test for miscibility with water [Withdrawn without replacement]
 ISO 757 Acetone for industrial use — Methods of test
 ISO 757-1:1982 Part 1: General [Withdrawn without replacement]
 ISO 757-2:1982 Part 2: Determination of acidity to phenolphthalein — Titrimetric method [Withdrawn without replacement]
 ISO 757-3:1982 Part 3: Test for miscibility with water [Withdrawn without replacement]
 ISO 757-4:1983 Part 4: Determination of permanganate time [Withdrawn without replacement]
 ISO 757-5:1982 Part 5: Control test with Agulhon's reagent [Withdrawn without replacement]
 ISO 758:1976 Liquid chemical products for industrial use — Determination of density at 20 degrees C
 ISO 759:1981 Volatile organic liquids for industrial use — Determination of dry residue after evaporation on water bath — General method
 ISO 760:1978 Determination of water — Karl Fischer method (General method)
 ISO 761:1977 Acetic anhydride and butan-1-ol for industrial use — Determination of bromine number [Withdrawn without replacement]
 ISO 762:2003 Fruit and vegetable products — Determination of mineral impurities content
 ISO 763:2003 Fruit and vegetable products — Determination of ash insoluble in hydrochloric acid
 ISO 764:2020 Horology — Magnetic resistant watches
 ISO 765:2016 Pesticides considered not to require common names
 ISO 766:1972 Fibre building boards — Determination of dimensions of test pieces [Withdrawn: replaced with ISO 9424]
 ISO 767:1975 Fibre building boards — Determination of moisture content [Withdrawn: replaced with ISO 9425]
 ISO 768:1972 Fibre building boards — Determination of bending strength [Withdrawn without replacement]
 ISO 769:1972 Fibre building boards — Hard and medium boards — Determination of water absorption and of swelling in thickness after immersion in water [Withdrawn without replacement]
 ISO 770:2002 Crude or rectified oils of Eucalyptus globulus (Eucalyptus globulus Labill.)
 ISO 771:1977 Oilseed residues — Determination of moisture and volatile matter content
 ISO 772:2011 Hydrometry — Vocabulary and symbols
 ISO/R 773:1969 Rectangular or square parallel keys and their corresponding keyways (Dimensions in millimetres) [Withdrawn without replacement]
 ISO/R 774:1969 Taper keys with or without gib head and their corresponding keyways (Dimensions in millimetres) [Withdrawn without replacement]
 ISO/R 775:1969 Cylindrical and 1/10 conical shaft ends [Withdrawn without replacement]
 ISO 776:2011 Pulps — Determination of acid-insoluble ash
 ISO 777:2005 Paper, board and pulp — Determination of acid-soluble calcium [Withdrawn: replaced with ISO 12830]
 ISO 778:2005 Paper, board and pulp — Determination of acid-soluble copper [Withdrawn: replaced with ISO 12830]
 ISO 779:2005 Paper, board and pulp — Determination of acid-soluble iron [Withdrawn: replaced with ISO 12830]
 ISO 780:2015 Packaging – Distribution packaging — Graphical symbols for handling and storage of packages
 ISO/R 781:1968 Measurement of fluid flow by means of Venturi tubes inserted in circular cross-section conduits running full [Withdrawn: replaced with ISO 5167, later ISO 5167-1]
 ISO 782:1975 Microcopying — Measurement of screen luminance of microfilm readers [Withdrawn without replacement, but later restored as ISO 7565]
 ISO 783:1999 Metallic materials — Tensile testing at elevated temperature [Withdrawn: replaced with ISO 6892-2]
 ISO/R 784:1968 Conventional signs to be used in schemes for the installations of sanitary systems in ships [Withdrawn without replacement]
 ISO/R 785:1968 Pesticides — Common names — Eighth series of terms [Withdrawn: replaced with ISO 1750]
 ISO/R 786:1968 Units and symbols for refrigeration [Withdrawn without replacement]
 ISO 787 General methods of test for pigments and extenders
 ISO 787-1:1982 Part 1: Comparison of colour of pigments
 ISO 787-2:1981 Part 2: Determination of matter volatile at 105 degrees C
 ISO 787-3:2000 Part 3: Determination of matter soluble in water — Hot extraction method
 ISO 787-4:1981 Part 4: Determination of acidity or alkalinity of the aqueous extract
 ISO 787-5:1980 Part 5: Determination of oil absorption value
 ISO 787-7:2009 Part 7: Determination of residue on sieve — Water method — Manual procedure
 ISO 787-8:2000 Part 8: Determination of matter soluble in water — Cold extraction method
 ISO 787-9:2019 Part 9: Determination of pH value of an aqueous suspension
 ISO 787-10:1993 Part 10: Determination of density — Pyknometer method
 ISO 787-11:1981 Part 11: Determination of tamped volume and apparent density after tamping
 ISO/R 787-12:1970 Part 12: Determination of [Withdrawn without replacement]
 ISO 787-13:2019 Part 13: Determination of water-soluble sulphates, chlorides and nitrates
 ISO 787-14:2019 Part 14: Determination of resistivity of aqueous extract
 ISO 787-15:2019 Part 15: Comparison of resistance to light of coloured pigments of similar types
 ISO 787-16:1986 Part 16: Determination of relative tinting strength (or equivalent colouring value) and colour on reduction of coloured pigments — Visual comparison method
 ISO 787-17:2019 Part 17: Comparison of lightening power of white pigments
 ISO 787-18:1983 Part 18: Determination of residue on sieve — Mechanical flushing procedure
 ISO 787-19:2020 Part 19: Determination of water-soluble nitrates (Salicylic acid method)
 ISO 787-20:1979 Part 20: Comparison of ease of dispersion (Oscillatory shaking method) [Withdrawn: replaced with ISO 8780-2]
 ISO 787-21:1979 Part 21: Comparison of heat stability of pigments using a stoving medium
 ISO 787-22:1980 Part 22: Comparison of resistance to bleeding of pigments
 ISO 787-23:1979 Part 23: Determination of density (using a centrifuge to remove entrained air)
 ISO 787-24:1985 Part 24: Determination of relative tinting strength of coloured pigments and relative scattering power of white pigments — Photometric methods
 ISO 787-25:2019 Part 25: Comparison of the colour, in full-shade systems, of white, black and coloured pigments — Colorimetric method
 ISO 787-28:2019 Part 28: Determination of total content of polychlorinated biphenyls (PCB) by dissolution, cleanup and GC-MS
 ISO 788:2021 Ultramarine pigments
 ISO 789 Agricultural tractors — Test procedures
 ISO 789-1:2018 Part 1: Power tests for power take-off
 ISO 789-2:2018 Part 2: Rear three-point linkage lifting capacity
 ISO 789-3:2015 Part 3: Turning and clearance diameters
 ISO 789-4:1986 Part 4: Measurement of exhaust smoke
 ISO 789-5:1983 Part 5: Partial power PTO — Non-mechanically transmitted power
 ISO 789-6:2019 Part 6: Centre of gravity
 ISO 789-7:1991 Part 7: Axle power determination
 ISO 789-8:1991 Part 8: Engine air cleaner
 ISO 789-9:2018 Part 9: Power tests for drawbar
 ISO/OECD 789-10:2006 Part 10: Hydraulic power at tractor/implement interface
 ISO 789-11:1996 Part 11: Steering capability of wheeled tractors
 ISO 789-12:2000 Part 12: Low temperature starting
 ISO 789-13:2018 Part 13: Vocabulary and specimen test report
 ISO 790:1973 Freight containers — Coding and identification [Withdrawn: replaced with ISO 6346]
 ISO 791:1973 Magnesium alloys — Determination of aluminium — 8-hydroxyquinoline gravimetric method
 ISO 792:1973 Magnesium and magnesium alloys — Determination of iron — Orthophenanthroline photometric method
 ISO 793:1973 Aluminium and aluminium alloys — Determination of iron — Orthophenanthroline photometric method
 ISO 794:1976 Magnesium and magnesium alloys — Determination of copper content — Oxalyldihydrazide photometric method
 ISO 795:1976 Aluminium and aluminium alloys — Determination of copper content — Oxalyldihydrazide photometric method
 ISO 796:1973 Aluminium alloys — Determination of copper — Electrolytic method
 ISO 797:1973 Aluminium and aluminium alloys — Determination of silicon — Gravimetric method
 ISO/R 798:1968 Chemical analysis of aluminium and its alloys — Gravimetric determination of zinc in aluminium alloys (zinc content between 0.50 and 6.5 %) [Withdrawn: replaced with ISO 1784]
 ISO 799 Ships and marine technology — Pilot ladders
 ISO 799-1:2019 Part 1: Design and specification
 ISO 800:1992 Plastics — Phenolic moulding materials — Specification [Withdrawn: replaced with ISO 14526]
 ISO 801 Pulps — Determination of saleable mass in lots
 ISO 801-1:1994 Part 1: Pulp baled in sheet form
 ISO 801-2:1994 Part 2: Pulps (such as flash-dried pulps) baled in slabs
 ISO 801-3:1994 Part 3: Unitized bales
 ISO 802:1976 Aluminium oxide primarily used for the production of aluminium — Preparation and storage of test samples [Withdrawn: replaced with ISO 23028]
 ISO 803:1976 Aluminium oxide primarily used for the production of aluminium — Determination of loss of mass at 300 degrees C (conventional moisture) [Withdrawn: replaced with ISO 806]
 ISO 804:1976 Aluminium oxide primarily used for the production of aluminium — Preparation of solution for analysis — Method by alkaline fusion [Withdrawn without replacement]
 ISO 805:1976 Aluminium oxide primarily used for the production of aluminium — Determination of iron content — 1,10- Phenanthroline photometric method [Withdrawn without replacement]
 ISO 806:2004 Aluminium oxide primarily used for the production of aluminium — Determination of loss of mass at 300 degrees C and 1 000 degrees C
 ISO/R 807:1968 Chemical analysis of magnesium and magnesium alloys — Polarographic determination of zinc (zinc content between 0.1 and 4 %) [Withdrawn without replacement]
 ISO 808:1973 Aluminium and aluminium alloys — Determination of silicon — Spectrophotometric method with the reduced silicomolybdic complex
 ISO 809:1973 Magnesium and magnesium alloys — Determination of manganese — Periodate photometric method (Manganese content between 0,01 and 0,8 %)
 ISO 810:1973 Magnesium and magnesium alloys — Determination of manganese — Periodate photometric method (Manganese content less than 0,01 %)
 ISO 811:2018 Textiles — Determination of resistance to water penetration — Hydrostatic pressure test
 ISO 812:2017 Rubber, vulcanized or thermoplastic — Determination of low-temperature brittleness
 ISO 813:2019 Rubber, vulcanized or thermoplastic — Determination of adhesion to a rigid substrate — 90 degree peel method
 ISO 814:2017 Rubber, vulcanized or thermoplastic — Determination of adhesion to metal — Two-plate method
 ISO 815 Rubber, vulcanized or thermoplastic — Determination of compression set
 ISO 815-1:2019 Part 1: At ambient or elevated temperatures
 ISO 815-2:2019 Part 2: At low temperatures
 ISO 816:1983 Rubber, vulcanized — Determination of tear strength of small test pieces (Delft test pieces) [Withdrawn: replaced with ISO 34-2]
 ISO 817:2014 Refrigerants — Designation and safety classification
 ISO 818:1975 Fibre building boards — Definition — Classification [Withdrawn without replacement]
 ISO 819:1975 Fibre building boards — Determination of density [Withdrawn: replaced with ISO 9427]
 ISO 820:1975 Particle boards — Definition and classification [Withdrawn without replacement]
 ISO 821:1975 Particle boards — Determination of dimensions of test pieces [Withdrawn: replaced with ISO 9424]
 ISO 822:1975 Particle boards — Determination of density [Withdrawn: replaced with ISO 9427]
 ISO 823:1975 Particle boards — Determination of moisture content [Withdrawn: replaced with ISO 9425]
 ISO/R 824 Household refrigerators
 ISO/R 824-1:1968 Part 1: Performance requirements [Withdrawn: replaced with ISO 7371]
 ISO/R 825 Household refrigerators
 ISO/R 825-1:1968 Part 1: Special low-temperature compartments for the storage of frozen foodstuffs [Withdrawn: replaced with ISO 7371]
 ISO/R 826:1968 Mechanical property limits for rolled products of aluminium and aluminium alloys [Withdrawn without replacement]
 ISO/R 827:1968 Mechanical property limits for extruded products of aluminium and aluminium alloys [Withdrawn without replacement]
 IEC/TR 828:1988 Pin allocations for future microprocessor systems using the IEC 603-2 connector [Withdrawn without replacement]
 ISO/R 829:1968 Mechanical property limits for aluminium alloy forgings [Withdrawn without replacement]
 ISO 830:1999 Freight containers — Vocabulary
 ISO/R 831:1968 Rules for construction of stationary boilers [Withdrawn without replacement]
 ISO 832:1994 Information and documentation — Bibliographic description and references — Rules for the abbreviation of bibliographic terms
 ISO 833:1974 Information and documentation — International list of periodical word title abbreviations [Withdrawn without replacement]
 ISO 834 Fire-resistance tests — Elements of building construction
 ISO 834-1:1999 Part 1: General requirements
 ISO 834-2:2019 Part 2: Requirements and recommendations for measuring furnace exposure on test samples
 ISO/TR 834-3:2012 Part 3: Commentary on test method and guide to the application of the outputs from the fire-resistance test
 ISO 834-4:2000 Part 4: Specific requirements for loadbearing vertical separating elements
 ISO 834-5:2000 Part 5: Specific requirements for loadbearing horizontal separating elements
 ISO 834-6:2000 Part 6: Specific requirements for beams
 ISO 834-7:2000 Part 7: Specific requirements for columns
 ISO 834-8:2002 Part 8: Specific requirements for non-loadbearing vertical separating elements
 ISO 834-9:2003 Part 9: Specific requirements for non-loadbearing ceiling elements
 ISO 834-10:2014 Part 10: Specific requirements to determine the contribution of applied fire protection materials to structural steel elements
 ISO 834-11:2014 Part 11: Specific requirements for the assessment of fire protection to structural steel elements
 ISO 834-12:2012 Part 12: Specific requirements for separating elements evaluated on less than full scale furnaces
 ISO 834-13:2019 Part 13: Requirements for the testing and assessment of applied fire protection to steel beams with web openings
 ISO 834-14:2019 Part 14: Requirements for the testing and assessment of applied fire protection to solid steel bar
 ISO 835:2007 Laboratory glassware — Graduated pipettes
 ISO 836:2001 Terminology for refractories
 ISO/R 837:1968 Aircraft seat rails and pins [Withdrawn: replaced with ISO 7166]
 ISO 838:1974 Paper — Holes for general filing purposes — Specifications
 ISO 839 Milling machine arbors with 7/24 tapers
 ISO 839-1:2006 Part 1: Dimensions and designation
 ISO 839-2:1977 Part 2: Accessories
 ISO 840:1973 Numerical control of machines — 7-bit coded character set [Withdrawn: replaced with ISO 6983-1]
 ISO 841:2001 Industrial automation systems and integration — Numerical control of machines — Coordinate system and motion nomenclature
 ISO 842:1984 Raw materials for paints and varnishes — Sampling [Withdrawn: replaced with ISO 15528]
 ISO 843:1997 Information and documentation — Conversion of Greek characters into Latin characters
 ISO 844:2014 Rigid cellular plastics — Determination of compression properties
 ISO 845:2006 Cellular plastics and rubbers — Determination of apparent density
 ISO 846:2019 Plastics — Evaluation of the action of microorganisms
 ISO/R 847:1968 Phosphoric acid for industrial use — Determination of sulphate content — Volumetric method [Withdrawn: replaced with ISO 2997]
 ISO 848:1981 Phosphoric acid for industrial use — Determination of calcium content — Titrimetric method [Withdrawn without replacement]
 ISO/R 849:1968 Phosphoric acid for industrial use — Determination of iron content — 2,2'- Bipyridyl spectrophotometric method [Withdrawn without replacement]
 ISO 850:1976 Sodium tripolyphosphate for industrial use — Determination of matter insoluble in water [Withdrawn without replacement]
 ISO 851:1976 Sodium tripolyphosphate for industrial use — Measurement of pH — Potentiometric method [Withdrawn without replacement]
 ISO/R 852:1968 Sodium tripolyphosphate and sodium pyrophosphate for industrial use — Determination of iron content — 2,2'- Bipyridyl spectrophotometric method [Withdrawn without replacement]
 ISO 853:1976 Sodium tripolyphosphate and sodium pyrophosphate for industrial use — Determination of loss on ignition [Withdrawn without replacement]
 ISO/R 854:1968 Requirements for 28-volt D.C. flat strip fuses for aircraft [Withdrawn without replacement]
 ISO 855:2003 Oil of lemon [Citrus limon (L.) Burm. f.], obtained by expression
 ISO 856:2006 Oil of peppermint (Mentha x piperita L.)
 ISO 857 Welding and allied processes — Vocabulary
 ISO 857-2:2005 Part 2: Soldering and brazing processes and related terms
 ISO 858:1973 Fishing nets — Designation of netting yarns in the Tex System
 ISO/R 859:1968 Testing and rating room air conditioners [Withdrawn: replaced with ISO 5151]
 ISO 860:2007 Terminology work — Harmonization of concepts and terms
 ISO/R 861:1968 Hexagon socket head cap screws — Metric series [Withdrawn: replaced with ISO 4762]
 ISO 862:1984 Surface active agents — Vocabulary
 ISO 863:2008 Cement — Test methods — Pozzolanicity test for pozzolanic cements
 ISO 864:1988 Arc welding — Solid and tubular cored wires which deposit carbon and carbon manganese steel — Dimensions of wires, spools, rims and coils [Withdrawn without replacement]
 ISO 865:1981 Slots in platens for projection welding machines
 ISO 866:2016 Centre drills for centre holes without protecting chamfers — Type A
 ISO/R 867:1968 Spindle noses and face plates — Bayonet type — Sizes for interchangeability — Metric series [Withdrawn: replaced with ISO 702-3]
 ISO 868:2003 Plastics and ebonite — Determination of indentation hardness by means of a durometer (Shore hardness)
 ISO/R 869:1968 Plastics — Preparation of specimens for optical tests on plastics materials — Moulding method [Withdrawn without replacement]
 ISO/R 870:1968 Plastics — Preparation of specimens for optical tests on plastics materials — Casting method [Withdrawn without replacement]
 ISO 871:2006 Plastics — Determination of ignition temperature using a hot-air furnace
 ISO/R 872:1968 Plastics — Determination of ash of unplasticized cellulose acetate [Withdrawn: replaced with ISO 3451-3]
 ISO 873:1980 Peaches — Guide to cold storage
 ISO 874:1980 Fresh fruits and vegetables — Sampling
 ISO 875:1999 Essential oils — Evaluation of miscibility in ethanol
 ISO/R 876:1968 Special method of mechanical testing to determine the coding for deep penetration electrodes [Withdrawn without replacement]
 ISO 877 Plastics — Methods of exposure to solar radiation
 ISO 877-1:2009 Part 1: General guidance
 ISO 877-2:2009 Part 2: Direct weathering and exposure behind window glass
 ISO 877-3:2018 Part 3: Intensified weathering using concentrated solar radiation
 ISO/R 878:1968 Plastics — Determination of resistance of plastics to color change upon exposure to light of the enclosed carbon arc [Withdrawn: replaced with ISO 4892]
 ISO/R 879:1968 Plastics — Determination of resistance of plastics to color change upon exposure to light of a xenon lamp [Withdrawn: replaced with ISO 4892]
 ISO 880:1981 Asbestos-cement siding shingles [Withdrawn without replacement]
 ISO 881:1980 Asbestos-cement pipes, joints and fittings for sewerage and drainage [Withdrawn without replacement]
 ISO 882 Cardamom (Elettaria cardamomum (Linnaeus) Maton var. minuscula Burkill) — Specification
 ISO 882-1:1993 Part 1: Whole capsules
 ISO 882-2:1993 Part 2: Seeds
 ISO 883:2013 Indexable hardmetal (carbide) inserts with rounded corners, without fixing hole — Dimensions
 ISO/R 884:1968 Pictorial marking of transit packages containing photographic materials sensitive to radiant energy [Withdrawn: replaced with ISO 780]
 ISO 885:2000 General purpose bolts and screws — Metric series — Radii under the head
 ISO 886:1973 Aluminium and aluminium alloys — Determination of manganese — Photometric method (Manganese content between 0,005 and 1,5 %)
 ISO 887:2000 Plain washers for metric bolts, screws and nuts for general purposes — General plan
 ISO 888:2012 Fasteners — Bolts, screws and studs — Nominal lengths and thread lengths
 ISO/R 889:1968 Test code for stationary steam generators of the power station type [Withdrawn without replacement]
 ISO/R 890:1968 Cinematography — Recording head gaps for two sound records on 16 mm magnetic film — Positions [Withdrawn: replaced with ISO 4242]
 ISO/R 891:1968 Cinematography — Recording head gaps for two sound records on 16 mm magnetic film — Dimensions [Withdrawn: replaced with ISO 4242]
 ISO/R 892:1968 Cinematography — Dimensions of projection reels for 8 mm motion-picture film (other than type S) [Withdrawn without replacement]
 ISO 893:1989 Surface active agents — Technical alkane sulfonates — Methods of analysis
 ISO 894:1977 Surface active agents — Technical sodium primary alkylsulphates — Methods of analysis
 ISO 895:1977 Surface active agents — Technical sodium secondary alkylsulphates — Methods of analysis
 ISO/TR 896:1977 Surface active agents — Scientific classification [Withdrawn without replacement]
 ISO 897:2000 Photography — Roll films, 126, 110 and 135-size films — Identification of the image-bearing side
 ISO 898 Mechanical properties of fasteners made of carbon steel and alloy steel
 ISO 899 Plastics — Determination of creep behaviour
 ISO 899-1:2017 Part 1: Tensile creep
 ISO 899-2:2003 Part 2: Flexural creep by three-point loading
 ISO 900:1977 Aluminium oxide primarily used for the production of aluminium — Determination of titanium content — Diantipyrylmethane photometric method [Withdrawn without replacement]
 ISO 901:1976 Aluminium oxide primarily used for the production of aluminium — Determination of absolute density — Pyknometer method [Withdrawn without replacement]
 ISO 902:1976 Aluminium oxide primarily used for the production of aluminium — Measurement of the angle of repose
 ISO 903:1976 Aluminium oxide primarily used for the production of aluminium — Determination of untamped density [Withdrawn without replacement]
 ISO 904:1976 Hydrochloric acid for industrial use — Determination of total acidity — Titrimetric method [Withdrawn without replacement]
 ISO 905:1976 Hydrochloric acid for industrial use — Evaluation of hydrochloric acid concentration by measurement of density [Withdrawn without replacement]
 ISO 906:1976 Hydrochloric acid for industrial use — Determination of sulphate content — Barium sulphate gravimetric method [Withdrawn without replacement]
 ISO 907:1976 Hydrochloric acid for industrial use — Determination of sulphated ash — Gravimetric method [Withdrawn without replacement]
 ISO 908:1980 Hydrochloric acid for industrial use — Determination of oxidizing or reducing substances content — Titrimetric method [Withdrawn without replacement]
 ISO/R 909:1968 Hydrochloric acid for industrial use — Determination of iron content — 2,2'- Bipyridyl spectrophotometric method [Withdrawn without replacement]
 ISO 910:1977 Sulphuric acid and oleum for industrial use — Determination of total acidity, and calculation of free sulphur trioxide content of oleum — Titrimetric method
 ISO 911:1977 Sulphuric acid for industrial use — Evaluation of sulphuric acid concentration by measurement of density [Withdrawn without replacement]
 ISO/R 912:1968 Sulphuric acid and oleum for industrial use — Determination of sulphur dioxide content — Barium sulphate gravimetric method [Withdrawn without replacement]
 ISO 913:1977 Sulphuric acid and oleum for industrial use — Determination of ash — Gravimetric method [Withdrawn without replacement]
 ISO 914:1977 Sulphuric acid and oleum for industrial use — Determination of total nitrogen content — Titrimetric method after distillation [Withdrawn without replacement]
 ISO/R 915:1968 Sulphuric acid and oleum for industrial use — Determination of iron content — 2,2'- Bipyridyl spectrophotometric method [Withdrawn without replacement]
 ISO 916:2020 Testing of refrigerating systems
 ISO 917:1989 Testing of refrigerant compressors [Withdrawn without replacement]
 ISO 918:1983 Volatile organic liquids for industrial use — Determination of distillation characteristics
 ISO/R 919:1969 Guide for the preparation of classified vocabularies (example of method) [Withdrawn: replaced with ISO 10241]
 ISO 920:1976 Wool — Determination of fibre length (barbe and hauteur) using a comb sorter
 ISO 921:1997 Nuclear energy — Vocabulary [Withdrawn without replacement]
 ISO/R 922:1969 Plastics — Polypropylene (PP) and propylene-copolymer thermoplastics — Determination of isotactic index [Withdrawn: replaced with ISO 1873-1, now replaced by ISO 9113]
 ISO 923:2000 Coal cleaning equipment — Performance evaluation
 ISO 924:1989 Coal preparation plant — Principles and conventions for flowsheets
 ISO 925:2019 Solid mineral fuels — Determination of carbonate carbon content — Gravimetric method
 ISO/R 926:1969 Solid mineral fuels — Determination of total nitrogen, sulphur, chlorine, and phosphorus — Gravimetric method [Withdrawn: replaced with ISO 333 (now withdrawn), ISO 334, ISO 352 (now withdrawn), and ISO 622]
 ISO 927:2009 Spices and condiments — Determination of extraneous matter and foreign matter content
 ISO 928:1997 Spices and condiments — Determination of total ash
 ISO 929:1980 Spices and condiments — Determination of water-insoluble ash [Withdrawn without replacement]
 ISO 930:1997 Spices and condiments — Determination of acid-insoluble ash
 ISO 931:1980 Green bananas — Guide to storage and transport
 ISO/R 932:1969 Animal fats — Determination of insoluble impurities content [Withdrawn: replaced with ISO 663]
 ISO/R 933:1969 Animal fats — Determination of moisture and volatile matter content [Withdrawn: replaced with ISO 662]
 ISO 934:1980 Animal and vegetable fats and oils — Determination of water content — Entrainment method
 ISO 935:1988 Animal and vegetable fats and oils — Determination of titre
 ISO 936:1998 Meat and meat products — Determination of total ash
 ISO 937:1978 Meat and meat products — Determination of nitrogen content (Reference method)
 ISO 938:1975 Hand-operated stillage trucks — Principal dimensions
 ISO 939:1980 Spices and condiments — Determination of moisture content — Entrainment method
 ISO 940:1979 Spices and condiments — Determination of alcohol-soluble extract [Withdrawn without replacement]
 ISO 941:1980 Spices and condiments — Determination of cold water-soluble extract
 ISO/R 942:1969 Whiteheart malleable cast iron [Withdrawn: replaced with ISO 5922]
 ISO/R 943:1969 Blackheart malleable cast iron [Withdrawn: replaced with ISO 5922]
 ISO/R 944:1969 Pearlitic malleable cast iron [Withdrawn: replaced with ISO 5922]
 ISO 945 Microstructure of cast irons
 ISO 945-1:2019 Part 1: Graphite classification by visual analysis
 ISO/TR 945-2:2011 Part 2: Graphite classification by image analysis
 ISO/TR 945-3:2016 Part 3: Matrix structures
 ISO 945-4:2019 Part 4: Test method for evaluating nodularity in spheroidal graphite cast irons
 ISO 946:1975 Grey cast iron — Beam unnotched impact test [Withdrawn without replacement]
 ISO/R 947:1969 Recommended practice for radiographic inspection of circumferential fusion welded butt joints in steel pipes up to 50 mm (2 in) wall thickness [Withdrawn: replaced with ISO 1106-3, later ISO 17636, now ISO 17636-1]
 ISO 948:1980 Spices and condiments — Sampling
 ISO 949:1987 Cauliflowers — Guide to cold storage and refrigerated transport
 ISO 950:1979 Cereals — Sampling (as grain) (Withdrawn: replaced by ISO 13690, later ISO 24333)
 ISO 951:1979 Pulses in bags — Sampling (Withdrawn: replaced by ISO 13690, later ISO 24333)
 ISO/R 952:1969 Light metal and light metal alloys — Tubes — Tensile Test [Withdrawn: replaced with ISO 6892-1]
 ISO/R 953:1969 Light metal and light metal alloys — Tubes — Drift expanding test [Withdrawn: replaced with ISO 8493]
 ISO/R 954:1969 Light metal and light metal alloys — Tubes — Bend test [Withdrawn: replaced with ISO 7438]
 ISO/R 955:1969 Aluminium and aluminium alloys — Tubes — Flattening test [Withdrawn: replaced with ISO 8492]
 ISO/R 956:1969 Light metal and light metal alloys — Wires — Tensile Test [Withdrawn: replaced with ISO 6892-1]
 ISO/R 957:1969 Aluminium and aluminium alloys — Wires — Simple torsion test [Withdrawn: replaced with ISO 7800]
 ISO/R 958:1969 Aluminium and aluminium alloys — Wires — Wrapping test [Withdrawn: replaced with ISO 7802]
 ISO 959 Pepper (Piper nigrum L.), whole or ground — Specification
 ISO 959-1:1998 Part 1: Black pepper
 ISO 959-2:1998 Part 2: White pepper
 ISO 960:1988 Plastics — Polyamides (PA) — Determination of water content [Withdrawn: replaced with ISO 15512]
 ISO/R 961:1969 Information processing — Implementation of the 6-bit and 7-bit coded character sets on 7- track 12,7 mm (0.5 in) magnetic tape [Withdrawn without replacement]
 ISO 962:1974 Information processing — Implementation of the 7- bit coded character set and its 7- bit and 8-bit extensions on 9- track 12,7 mm (0.5 in) magnetic tape
 ISO 963:1973 Information processing — Guide for the definition of 4- bit character sets derived from the 7- bit coded character set for information processing interchange [Withdrawn without replacement]
 ISO/R 964:1969 Shipbuilding details — Mating dimensions for pipeline flanges for ships
 ISO 965 ISO general purpose metric screw threads — Tolerances
 ISO/R 966:1969 Seeds — Sampling and methods of test [Withdrawn without replacement]
 ISO/R 967:1969 Pesticides — Common names — Ninth series of terms [Withdrawn: replaced with ISO 1750]
 ISO/R 968:1969 Pesticides — Common names — Tenth series of terms [Withdrawn: replaced with ISO 1750]
 ISO/R 969:1969 Pesticides — Common names — Eleventh series of terms [Withdrawn: replaced with ISO 1750]
 ISO/R 970:1969 Pesticides — Common names — Twelfth series of terms [Withdrawn: replaced with ISO 1750]
 ISO/R 971:1969 Pesticides — Common names — Thirteenth series of terms [Withdrawn: replaced with ISO 1750]
 ISO 972:1997 Chillies and capsicums, whole or ground (powdered) — Specification
 ISO 973:1999 Pimento (allspice) [Pimenta dioica (L.) Merr.], whole or ground — Specification
 ISO 974:2000 Plastics — Determination of the brittleness temperature by impact
 ISO 975:2021 Brown coals and lignites — Determination of yield of benzene-soluble extract — Semi-automatic method
 ISO 976:2013 Rubber and plastics — Polymer dispersions and rubber latices — Determination of pH
 ISO/R 977:1969 Sodium hydroxide for industrial use — Preparation and storage of test sample [Withdrawn: replaced with ISO 3195]
 ISO/R 978:1969 Sodium hydroxide for industrial use — Preparation of sample solution [Withdrawn: replaced with ISO 3195]
 ISO 979:1974 Sodium hydroxide for industrial use — Method of assay
 ISO 980:1976 Sodium hydroxide for industrial use — Determination of carbonates content — Gas-volumetric method [Withdrawn without replacement]
 ISO 981:1973 Sodium hydroxide for industrial use — Determination of chloride content — Mercurimetric method
 ISO 982:1976 Sodium hydroxide for industrial use — Determination of sulphate content — Barium sulphate gravimetric method [Withdrawn without replacement]
 ISO 983:1974 Sodium hydroxide for industrial use — Determination of iron content — 1,10- Phenanthroline photometric method [Withdrawn without replacement]
 ISO 984:1974 Sodium hydroxide for industrial use — Determination of silica content — Reduced silico-molybdic complex photometric method [Withdrawn without replacement]
 ISO 985:1974 Sodium hydroxide for industrial use — Determination of silica content — Gravimetric method by precipitation of quinoline molybdosilicate [Withdrawn without replacement]
 ISO 986:1976 Sodium hydroxide for industrial use — Determination of calcium content — EDTA (disodium salt) complexometric method [Withdrawn without replacement]
 ISO/R 987:1969 Sodium hydroxide for industrial use — Determination of water insoluble matter [Withdrawn without replacement]
 ISO/R 988:1969 Potassium hydroxide for industrial use — Preparation and storage of test sample [Withdrawn: replaced with ISO 2466]
 ISO/R 989:1969 Potassium hydroxide for industrial use — Preparation of sample solution [Withdrawn: replaced with ISO 2466]
 ISO 990:1974 Potassium hydroxide for industrial use — Method of assay [Withdrawn without replacement]
 ISO 991:1976 Potassium hydroxide for industrial use — Determination of carbonates content — Gas-volumetric method [Withdrawn without replacement]
 ISO 992:1975 Potassium hydroxide for industrial use — Determination of chlorides content — Mercurimetric method [Withdrawn without replacement]
 ISO 993:1976 Potassium hydroxide for industrial use — Determination of sulphate content — Barium sulphate gravimetric method [Withdrawn without replacement]
 ISO 994:1973 Potassium hydroxide for industrial use — Determination of iron content — 1,10- Phenanthroline photometric method [Withdrawn without replacement]
 ISO 995:1975 Potassium hydroxide for industrial use — Determination of silica content — Reduced silico-molybdic complex photometric method [Withdrawn without replacement]
 ISO 996:1976 Potassium hydroxide for industrial use — Determination of silica content — Gravimetric method by precipitation of quinoline molybdosilicate [Withdrawn without replacement]
 ISO 997:1976 Potassium hydroxide for industrial use — Determination of calcium content — EDTA (disodium salt) complexometric method [Withdrawn without replacement]
 ISO/R 998:1969 Potassium hydroxide for industrial use — Determination of water insoluble matter [Withdrawn without replacement]
 ISO 999:1996 Information and documentation — Guidelines for the content, organization, and presentation of indexes

ISO 1000 – ISO 1499 
 ISO 1000 SI units and recommendations for the use of their multiples and of certain other units [Withdrawn 2009-11-17: replaced with ISO 80000-1]
 ISO/IEC 1001:2012 Information technology – File structure and labelling of magnetic tapes for information interchange
 ISO 1002:1983 Rolling bearings — Airframe bearings — Characteristics, boundary dimensions, tolerances, static load ratings
 ISO 1003:2008 Spices — Ginger (Zingiber officinale Roscoe) — Specification
 ISO 1004 Information processing – Magnetic ink character recognition – Print specifications
 ISO 1004-1:2013 Part 1: Print specifications for E-13B
 ISO 1004-2:2013 Part 2: Print specifications for CMC7
 ISO 1005 Railway rolling stock material
 ISO 1005-1:1994 Part 1: Rough-rolled tyres for tractive and trailing stock — Technical delivery conditions
 ISO 1005-2:1986 Part 2: Tyres, wheel centres and tyred wheels for tractive and trailing stock — Dimensional, balancing and assembly requirements
 ISO 1005-3:1982 Part 3: Axles for tractive and trailing stock — Quality requirements
 ISO 1005-4:1986 Part 4: Rolled or forged wheel centres for tyred wheels for tractive and trailing stock — Quality requirements
 ISO/R 1005-5:1969 Part 5: Cast wheel centres in non-alloy steel for tyred wheels for trailer stock [Withdrawn without replacement]
 ISO 1005-6:1994 Part 6: Solid wheels for tractive and trailing stock — Technical delivery conditions
 ISO 1005-7:1982 Part 7: Wheelsets for tractive and trailing stock — Quality requirements
 ISO 1005-8:1986 Part 8: Solid wheels for tractive and trailing stock — Dimensional and balancing requirements
 ISO 1005-9:1986 Part 9: Axles for tractive and trailing stock — Dimensional requirements
 ISO 1006:1983 Building construction — Modular coordination — Basic module [Withdrawn: replaced with ISO 21723]
 ISO 1007 Photography – 135-size film and magazine – Specifications
 ISO 1008:1992 Photography — Paper dimensions — Pictorial sheets
 ISO 1009:2000 Photography — Paper dimensions — Rolls for printers
 ISO 1010:1973 Photography — Colour paper for general use — Sizes of sheet material [Withdrawn: replaced with ISO 1008]
 ISO 1011:1973 Photography — Colour paper for roll paper printers — Sizes of rolls [Withdrawn: replaced with ISO 1009]
 ISO 1012:1998 Photography — Films in sheets and rolls for general use — Dimensions
 ISO 1013:2020 Coke — Determination of bulk density in a large container
 ISO 1014:2021 Coke — Determination of true relative density, apparent relative density and porosity
 ISO 1015:1992 Brown coals and lignites — Determination of moisture content — Direct volumetric method [Withdrawn without replacement]
 ISO/R 1016:1969 Brown coals and lignites — Determination of ash [Withdrawn: replaced with ISO 1171]
 ISO 1017:2006 Brown coals and lignites — Determination of acetone-soluble material
 ISO 1018:2019 Hard coal — Determination of moisture-holding capacity
 ISO 1019:1982 Cinematography — Spools, daylight loading type for 16 mm motion-picture cameras — Dimensions
 ISO 1020:1974 Cinematography — Spools, daylight loading type for double-8 mm motion-picture cameras — Dimensions [Withdrawn without replacement]
 ISO 1021:1980 Aircraft — Engine nacelle fire extinguisher apertures and doors
 ISO 1022:1988 Aerospace — Gaseous oxygen replenishment connection for use in fluid systems (old type) — Dimensions (Inch series) (Not valid for new designs) [Withdrawn: replaced with ISO 8775 on 2012-04-02]
 ISO 1023:1974 Aircraft — High pressure air charging valves [Withdrawn without replacement]
 ISO 1024:1989 Metallic materials — Hardness test — Rockwell superficial test (scales 15N, 30N, 45N, 15T, 30T and 45T) [Withdrawn: replaced with ISO 6508-1]
 ISO 1025:1981 Textile machinery and accessories — Sectional beams for warp knitting machines — Terminology and main dimensions [Withdrawn: replaced with ISO 8116-5]
 ISO 1026:1982 Fruit and vegetable products — Determination of dry matter content by drying under reduced pressure and of water content by azeotropic distillation
 ISO 1027:1983 Radiographic image quality indicators for non-destructive testing — Principles and identification [Withdrawn: replaced with ISO 19232-(1-2)]
 ISO 1028:1973 Information processing — Flowchart symbols [Withdrawn: replaced with ISO 5807]
 ISO 1029:1974 Coniferous sawn timber — Defects — Classification
 ISO 1030:1975 Coniferous sawn timber — Defects — Measurement
 ISO 1031:1974 Coniferous sawn timber — Defects — Terms and definitions
 ISO 1032:1974 Coniferous sawn timber — Sizes — Terms and definitions [Withdrawn: replaced with ISO 24294]
 ISO 1033:1975 Aircraft — Dimensions for general purpose push-pull three-pole circuit-breakers
 ISO 1034:1973 Aircraft – Ground air-conditioning connections
 ISO 1035 Hot-rolled steel bars
 ISO 1035-1 Part 1: Dimensions of round bars
 ISO 1035-2 Part 2: Dimensions of square bars
 ISO 1035-3 Part 3: Dimensions of flat bars
 ISO 1035-4 Part 4: Tolerances
 ISO 1036:1984 Textile machinery — Dyeing and finishing machines — Definition of left and right sides
 ISO 1037:1982 Textile machinery and accessories — Beams for dyeing slivers and yarn — Terminology and main dimensions [Withdrawn: replaced with ISO 8116-7]
 ISO/R 1038:1969 Rolling bearings — Cylindrical rolling bearings — Radial internal clearance [Withdrawn: replaced with ISO 5753]
 ISO 1039:1995 Cinematography — Cores for motion-picture and magnetic film rolls — Dimensions
 ISO 1040:1983 Building construction — Modular coordination — Multimodules for horizontal coordinating dimensions [Withdrawn: replaced with ISO 21723]
 ISO 1041:1973 Essential oils — Determination of freezing point
 ISO 1042:1998 Laboratory glassware — One-mark volumetric flasks
 ISO 1043 Plastics — Symbols and abbreviated terms
 ISO 1043-1:2011 Part 1: Basic polymers and their special characteristics
 ISO 1043-2:2011 Part 2: Fillers and reinforcing materials
 ISO 1043-3:2016 Part 3: Plasticizers
 ISO 1043-4:2021 Part 4: Flame retardants
 ISO 1044:1993 Industrial trucks — Lead-acid traction batteries for electric trucks — Preferred voltages [Withdrawn without replacement]
 ISO/R 1045:1969 Straight resistance spot welding electrodes – Dimensions [Withdrawn: replaced with ISO 5184]
 ISO 1046:1973 Architectural and building drawings — Vocabulary [Withdrawn: replaced with ISO 10209-1, now ISO 10209]
 ISO 1047:1973 Architectural and building drawings — Presentation of drawings — Scales [Withdrawn without replacement]
 ISO 1048:1991 Photography — Exposed roll films — Identification [Withdrawn: replaced with ISO 732]
 ISO 1049:1975 Continuous mechanical handling equipment for loose bulk materials — Vibrating conveyors and feeders with rectangular or trapezoidal trough
 ISO 1050:1975 Continuous mechanical handling equipment for loose bulk materials — Screw conveyors
 ISO 1051:1999 Rivet shank diameters
 ISO 1052:1982 Steels for general engineering purposes [Withdrawn without replacement]
 ISO 1053:1975 Zinc — Determination of copper content — Spectrophotometric method [Withdrawn without replacement]
 ISO 1054:1975 Zinc — Determination of cadmium content — Polarographic method [Withdrawn without replacement]
 ISO 1055:1975 Zinc and zinc alloys — Determination of iron content — Spectrophotometric method [Withdrawn without replacement]
 ISO 1056:1975 Numerical control of machines — Punched tape block formats — Coding of preparatory functions G and miscellaneous functions M [Withdrawn: replaced with ISO 6983-1]
 ISO 1057:1973 Numerical control of machines — Interchangeable punched tape variable block format for positioning and straight-cut machining [Withdrawn: replaced with ISO 6983-1]
 ISO 1058:1973 Numerical control of machines — Punched tape variable block for positioning and straight-cut machining [Withdrawn: replaced with ISO 6983-1]
 ISO 1059:1973 Numerical control of machines — Punched tape fixed block format for positioning and straight-cut machining [Withdrawn: replaced with ISO 6983-1]
 ISO 1060 Plastics — Homopolymer and copolymer resins of vinyl chloride
 ISO 1060-1:1998 Part 1: Designation system and basis for specifications [Withdrawn: replaced with ISO 24024-1]
 ISO 1060-2:1998 Part 2: Preparation of test samples and determination of properties [Withdrawn: replaced with ISO 24024-2]
 ISO 1061:1990 Plastics — Unplasticized cellulose acetate — Determination of free acidity
 ISO/R 1062:1969 Pesticides — Common names — Fourteenth series of terms [Withdrawn: replaced with ISO 1750]
 ISO 1063:1974 Surface active agents — Determination of stability in hard water
 ISO 1064:1974 Surface active agents — Determination of apparent density of pastes on filling
 ISO 1065:1991 Non-ionic surface-active agents obtained from ethylene oxide and mixed non-ionic surface-active agents — Determination of cloud point
 ISO 1066:1975 Analysis of soaps — Determination of glycerol content — Titrimetric method
 ISO 1067:1974 Analysis of soaps — Determination of unsaponifiable, unsaponified and unsaponified saponifiable matter
 ISO 1068:1975 Plastics — Homopolymer and copolymer resins of vinyl chloride — Determination of compacted apparent bulk density
 ISO 1069:1973 Magnetic compasses and binnacles for sea navigation – Vocabulary
 ISO 1070:1992 Liquid flow measurement in open channels – Slope-area method
 ISO 1071:2015 Welding consumables — Covered electrodes, wires, rods and tubular cored electrodes for fusion welding of cast iron — Classification
 ISO 1072:1975 Solid wood parquet — General characteristics
 ISO 1073 Alphanumeric character sets for optical recognition
 ISO 1073-1:1976 Part 1: Character set OCR-A – Shapes and dimensions of the printed image
 ISO 1073-2:1976 Part 2: Character set OCR-B – Shapes and dimensions of the printed image
 ISO 1074:1991 Counterbalanced fork-lift trucks — Stability tests [Withdrawn: replaced with ISO 22915-2]
 ISO/R 1075:1969 Performance requirements for heat-resisting (190 °C) electrical cables with copper conductors for aircraft [Withdrawn without replacement]
 ISO/R 1076:1969 General purpose electric cables with aluminium or aluminium alloy conductors for aircraft [Withdrawn without replacement]
 ISO/R 1077:1969 Dimensions of elastometric toroidal sealing rings for pipe-fittings in aircraft (Inch series – Class 1 tolerances) [Withdrawn without replacement]
 ISO/R 1078:1969 Dimensions of elastometric toroidal sealing rings for aircraft (Inch series – Class 1 tolerances) [Withdrawn without replacement]
 ISO 1079:1989 Metallic materials — Hardness test — Verification of Rockwell superficial hardness testing machines (scales 15N, 30N, 45N, 15T, 30T and 45T) [Withdrawn: replaced with ISO 6508-2]
 ISO 1080:1975 Machine tools — Morse taper shanks — Cotter slots with taper keys
 ISO 1081:2013 Belt drives – V-belts and V-ribbed belts, and corresponding grooved pulleys – Vocabulary
 ISO 1082:1990 Mining — Shackle type connector units for chain conveyors
 ISO 1083:2018 Spheroidal graphite cast irons — Classification
 ISO 1084:1975 Industrial tractors — Definition and nominal rating [Withdrawn without replacement]
 ISO 1085:2016 Assembly tools for screws and nuts — Double-ended wrenches — Size pairing
 ISO 1086:1991 Information and documentation – Title leaves of books
 ISO 1087:2019 Terminology work and terminology science — Vocabulary
 ISO 1088:2007 Hydrometry – Velocity-area methods using current-meters – Collection and processing of data for determination of uncertainties in flow measurement
 ISO 1089:1980 Electrode taper fits for spot welding equipment — Dimensions
 ISO 1090:1981 Office machines and data processing equipment — Function key symbols on typewriters [Withdrawn: replaced with ISO 9995-(1,7)]
 ISO 1091:1977 Typewriters — Layout of printing and function keys [Withdrawn: replaced with ISO 9995-(1,7)]
 ISO 1092
 ISO 1092-1:1974 Adding machines and calculating machines — Numeric section of ten-key keyboards [Withdrawn: replaced with ISO 9995-(1,7)]
 ISO 1093:1981 Adding machines and calculating machines — Keytop and printed or displayed symbols [Withdrawn: replaced with ISO 9995-(1,7)]
 ISO/R 1094:1969 Adding machines and calculating machines — Classification [Withdrawn without replacement]
 ISO 1095:1989 Shipbuilding and marine structures — Toughened safety glass panes for side scuttles [Withdrawn: replaced with ISO 21005]
 ISO 1096:2021 Plywood — Classification
 ISO 1097:1975 Plywood — Measurement of dimensions of panels [Withdrawn without replacement]
 ISO 1098:1975 Veneer plywood for general use — General requirements [Withdrawn without replacement]
 ISO 1099:2017 Metallic materials — Fatigue testing — Axial force-controlled method [Withdrawn without replacement]
 ISO 1100 Hydrometry – Measurement of liquid flow in open channels
 ISO 1100-1:1996 Part 1: Establishment and operation of a gauging station [Withdrawn: replaced with ISO 18365]
 ISO 1100-2:2010 Part 2: Determination of the stage-discharge relationship [Withdrawn: replaced with ISO 18320]
 ISO 1101:2017 Geometrical product specifications (GPS) – Geometrical tolerancing – Tolerances of form, orientation, location and run-out
 ISO 1102:2001 Commercial road vehicles — 50 mm drawbar eye — Interchangeability
 ISO 1103:2007 Road vehicles — Coupling balls for caravans and light trailers — Dimensions
 ISO 1104:1977 Surface active agents — Technical sodium alkylarylsulphonates (excluding benzene derivatives) — Methods of analysis
 ISO/R 1105:1969 Pesticides considered not to require common names — Second list [Withdrawn: replaced with ISO 765]
 ISO 1106 Recommended practice for radiographic examination of fusion welded joints
 ISO 1106-1:1984 Part 1: Fusion welded butt joints in steel plates up to 50 mm thick [Withdrawn: replaced with ISO 17636]
 ISO 1106-2:1985 Part 2: Fusion welded butt joints in steel plates thicker than 50 mm and up to and including 200 mm in thickness [Withdrawn: replaced with ISO 17636]
 ISO 1106-3:1984 Part 3: Fusion welded circumferential joints in steel pipes of up to 50 mm wall thickness [Withdrawn: replaced with ISO 17636]
 ISO 1107:2017 Fishing nets – Netting – Basic terms and definitions
 ISO 1108:1992 Spices and condiments — Determination of non-volatile ether extract
 ISO 1109:1975 Refractory products — Classification of dense shaped refractory products [Withdrawn: replaced with ISO 10081-1]
 ISO 1110:2019 Plastics — Polyamides — Accelerated conditioning of test specimens
 ISO 1111 Single cold-reduced tinplate and single cold-reduced blackplate
 ISO 1111-1:1983 Part 1: Electrolytic and hot-dipped tinplate sheet and blackplate sheet [Withdrawn: replaced with ISO 11949]
 ISO 1111-2:1983 Part 2: Electrolytic tinplate coil and blackplate coil for subsequent cutting into sheet form [Withdrawn: replaced with ISO 11949]
 ISO 1112:2009 Horology – Functional and non-functional jewels
 ISO 1113:1979 Information processing – Representation of the 7- bit coded character set on punched tape
 ISO 1114:1977 Cocoa beans — Cut test [Withdrawn: replaced with ISO 2451]
 ISO/R 1115:1969 Finishes with the external screw thread for glass containers and gauges for inspection of screw closures [Withdrawn without replacement]
 ISO 1116:1999 Micrographics — 16 mm and 35 mm microfilm spools and reels — Specifications [Withdrawn without replacement]
 ISO 1117:1975 Bonded abrasive products — Grinding-wheel dimensions (Part 2)  [Withdrawn: replaced with ISO 603-(1-16)]
 ISO 1118:1978 Aluminium and aluminium alloys — Determination of titanium — Spectrophotometric chromotropic acid method
 ISO 1119:2011 Geometrical product specifications (GPS) – Series of conical tapers and taper angles
 ISO 1120:2012 Conveyor belts — Determination of strength of mechanical fastenings — Static test method
 ISO 1121:1976 Conveyor belts — List of characteristics which may be required according to use [Withdrawn without replacement]
 ISO 1122 Vocabulary of gear terms
 ISO 1122-1:1998 Part 1: Definitions related to geometry
 ISO 1122-2:1999 Part 2: Definitions related to worm gear geometry
 ISO 1123:1976 Tapered roller bearings — Inch series — Chamfer dimension limits [Withdrawn without replacement]
 ISO 1124:1988 Rubber compounding ingredients — Carbon black shipment sampling procedures
 ISO 1125:2015 Rubber compounding ingredients — Carbon black — Determination of ash
 ISO 1126:2015 Rubber compounding ingredients — Carbon black — Determination of loss on heating
 ISO 1127:1992 Stainless steel tubes — Dimensions, tolerances and conventional masses per unit length
 ISO/R 1128:1969 Steel tubes — Butt-welding bends 5D (90° and 180°) [Withdrawn: replaced with ISO 3419]
 ISO 1129:1980 Steel tubes for boilers, superheaters and heat exchangers — Dimensions, tolerances and conventional masses per unit length [Withdrawn without replacement]
 ISO 1130:1975 Textile fibres — Some methods of sampling for testing
 ISO 1131:1976 Textile machinery and accessories — Weft pirns for box-loaders for automatic looms — Dimensions of pirn tip [Withdrawn without replacement]
 ISO 1132 Rolling bearings – Tolerances
 ISO 1132-1:2000 Part 1: Terms and definitions
 ISO 1132-2:2001 Part 2: Measuring and gauging principles and methods
 ISO 1133 Plastics — Determination of the melt mass-flow rate (MFR) and melt volume-flow rate (MVR) of thermoplastics
 ISO 1133-1:2011 Part 1: Standard method
 ISO 1133-2:2011 Part 2: Method for materials sensitive to time-temperature history and/or moisture
 ISO 1134:1993 Pears — Cold storage
 ISO 1135 Transfusion equipment for medical use
 ISO 1135-1:1987 Part 1: Glass transfusion bottles, closures and caps [Withdrawn without replacement]
 ISO 1135-3:2016 Part 3: Blood-taking sets for single use
 ISO 1135-4:2015 Part 4: Transfusion sets for single use, gravity feed
 ISO 1135-5:2015 Part 5: Transfusion sets for single use with pressure infusion apparatus
 ISO 1136:2015 Wool — Determination of mean diameter of fibres — Air permeability method
 ISO 1137:1975 Plastics — Determination of behaviour in a ventilated tubular oven [Withdrawn without replacement]
 ISO 1138:2007 Rubber compounding ingredients — Carbon black — Determination of sulfur content
 ISO 1139:1973 Textiles — Designation of yarns
 ISO 1140:2021 Fibre ropes — Polyamide — 3-, 4-, 8- and 12-strand ropes
 ISO 1141:2021 Fibre ropes — Polyester — 3-, 4-, 8- and 12-strand ropes
 ISO 1142:1973 Ropes — Sampling and conditioning for testing [Withdrawn: replaced with ISO 2307]
 ISO 1143:2021 Metallic materials — Rotating bar bending fatigue testing
 ISO 1144:2016 Textiles — Universal system for designating linear density (Tex System)
 ISO/R 1145:1969 Refractory arch bricks — Dimensions [Withdrawn: replaced with ISO 5019-2]
 ISO 1146:1988 Pyrometric reference cones for laboratory use – Specification
 ISO 1147:1995 Plastics/rubber — Polymer dispersions and synthetic rubber latices — Freeze-thaw cycle stability test
 ISO 1148:1980 Plastics — Aqueous dispersions of polymers and copolymers — Determination of pH [Withdrawn: replaced with ISO 976]
 ISO/R 1149:1969 Layout of multilingual classified vocabularies [Withdrawn: replaced with ISO 10241]
 ISO 1150:1997 Textile machinery and accessories — Drop wires for warp stop motions for weaving machines with automatic drawing-in
 ISO 1151 Flight dynamics – Concepts, quantities and symbols
 ISO 1151-1:1988 Part 1: Aircraft motion relative to the air
 ISO 1151-2:1985 Part 2: Motions of the aircraft and the atmosphere relative to the Earth
 ISO 1151-3:1989 Part 3: Derivatives of forces, moments and their coefficients
 ISO 1151-4:1994 Part 4: Concepts and quantities used in the study of aircraft stability and control
 ISO 1151-5:1987 Part 5: Quantities used in measurements
 ISO 1151-6:1982 Part 6: Aircraft geometry
 ISO 1151-7:1985 Part 7: Flight points and flight envelopes
 ISO 1151-8:1992 Part 8: Concepts and quantities used in the study of the dynamic behaviour of the aircraft
 ISO 1151-9:1993 Part 9: Models of atmospheric motions along the trajectory of the aircraft
 ISO 1152:1974 Flight dynamics – Concepts, quantities and symbols – Part 2: Motions of the aircraft and the atmosphere relative to the Earth [Renamed ISO 1151-2]
 ISO 1153:1972 Flight dynamics – Concepts, quantities and symbols – Part 3: Derivatives of forces, moments and their coefficients [Renamed ISO 1151-3]
 ISO 1154:1975 Information processing – Punched paper tape – Dimensions and location of feed holes and code holes
 ISO 1155:1978 Information processing – Use of longitudinal parity to detect errors in information messages
 ISO/R 1156:1969 Shipbuilding details – Wrought aluminium alloys for use in shipbuilding [Withdrawn without replacement]
 ISO 1157:1990 Plastics — Cellulose acetate in dilute solution — Determination of viscosity number and viscosity ratio [Withdrawn without replacement]
 ISO 1158:1998 Plastics — Vinyl chloride homopolymers and copolymers — Determination of chlorine content
 ISO 1159:1978 Plastics — Vinyl chloride-vinyl acetate copolymers — Determination of vinyl acetate [Withdrawn without replacement]
 ISO 1160:1976 Rolling bearings for railway axle-boxes — Acceptance inspection [Withdrawn without replacement]
 ISO 1161:2016 Series 1 freight containers — Corner and intermediate fittings — Specifications
 ISO 1162:1975 Cereals and pulses — Method of test for infestation by X-ray examination [Withdrawn: replaced with ISO 6639-4]
 ISO 1163 Plastics — Unplasticized poly(vinyl chloride) (PVC-U) moulding and extrusion materials
 ISO 1163-1:1995 Part 1: Designation system and basis for specifications [Withdrawn: replaced with ISO 21306-1]
 ISO 1163-2:1995 Part 2: Preparation of test specimens and determination of properties [Withdrawn: replaced with ISO 21306-2]
 ISO/R 1164:1970 Polyethylene (PE) pipes — Tolerances on outside diameters [Withdrawn: replaced with ISO 3607, now ISO 11922-(1-2)]
 ISO/R 1165:1970 Unplasticized polyvinyl chloride (PVC) pipes — Tolerances on wall thicknesses up to 6 mm [Withdrawn: replaced with ISO 3606, now ISO 11922-(1-2)]
 ISO/R 1166:1970 Polyethylene (PE) pipes — Tolerances on wall thicknesses up to 6 mm [Withdrawn: replaced with ISO 3607, now ISO 11922-(1-2)]
 ISO 1167 Thermoplastics pipes, fittings and assemblies for the conveyance of fluids — Determination of the resistance to internal pressure
 ISO 1167-1:2006 Part 1: General method
 ISO 1167-2:2006 Part 2: Preparation of pipe test pieces
 ISO 1168:1973 Combine harvesters — Width of cut and number of knife sections [Withdrawn without replacement]
 ISO 1169:2006 Zinc alloys — Determination of aluminium content — Titrimetric method
 ISO 1170:2020 Coal and coke — Calculation of analyses to different bases
 ISO 1171:2010 Solid mineral fuels — Determination of ash
 ISO 1172:1996 Textile-glass-reinforced plastics — Prepregs, moulding compounds and laminates — Determination of the textile-glass and mineral-filler content — Calcination methods
 ISO 1173:2001 Assembly tools for screws and nuts — Drive ends for hand- and machine-operated screwdriver bits and connecting parts — Dimensions, torque testing
 ISO 1174 Assembly tools for screws and nuts — Driving squares
 ISO 1174-1:2011 Part 1: Driving squares for hand socket tools
 ISO 1174-2:1996 Part 2: Driving squares for power socket tools
 ISO 1175:1976 Shipbuilding — Dimensions and sectional properties of aluminium alloy sections for marine use [Withdrawn without replacement]
 ISO 1176:1990 Road vehicles – Masses – Vocabulary and codes
 ISO 1177:1985 Information processing – Character structure for start/stop and synchronous character oriented transmission
 ISO 1178:1976 Magnesium alloys — Determination of soluble zirconium — Alizarin sulphonate photometric method
 ISO 1179 Connections for general use and fluid power — Ports and stud ends with ISO 228-1 threads with elastomeric or metal-to-metal sealing
 ISO 1179-1:2013 Part 1: Threaded ports
 ISO 1179-2:2013 Part 2: Heavy-duty (S series) and light-duty (L series) stud ends with elastomeric sealing (type E)
 ISO 1179-3:2007 Part 3: Light-duty (L series) stud ends with sealing by O-ring with retaining ring (types G and H)
 ISO 1179-4:2007 Part 4: Stud ends for general use only with metal-to-metal sealing (type B)
 ISO 1180:1983 Shanks for pneumatic tools and fitting dimensions of chuck bushings
 ISO 1181:2004 Fibre ropes — Manila and sisal — 3-, 4- and 8-strand ropes
 ISO 1182:2020 Reaction to fire tests for products—Non-combustibility test
 ISO 1183 Plastics — Methods for determining the density of non-cellular plastics
 ISO 1183-1:2019 Part 1: Immersion method, liquid pycnometer method and titration method
 ISO 1183-2:2019 Part 2: Density gradient column method
 ISO 1183-3:1999 Part 3: Gas pyknometer method
 ISO 1184:1983 Plastics — Determination of tensile properties of films [Withdrawn: replaced with ISO 527-3]
 ISO 1185:2003 Road vehicles — Connectors for the electrical connection of towing and towed vehicles — 7-pole connector type 24 N (normal) for vehicles with 24 V nominal supply voltage
 ISO/R 1186:1970 Pressures in brake lines and braking efficiency [Withdrawn without replacement]
 ISO 1187:1983 Special wrought copper alloys — Chemical composition and forms of wrought products [Withdrawn without replacement]
 ISO 1188:1984 Cinematography — Recorded characteristic for magnetic sound on full-coat 16 mm motion-picture film — Specifications
 ISO 1189:1986 Cinematography — Recorded characteristic for magnetic sound records on 35 mm motion-picture film excluding striped release prints — Specifications
 ISO 1190 Copper and copper alloys — Code of designation
 ISO 1190-1:1982 Part 1: Designation of materials
 ISO 1190-2:1982 Part 2: Designation of tempers
 ISO 1191:1975 Plastics — Polyethylenes and polypropylenes in dilute solution — Determination of viscosity number and of limiting viscosity number [Withdrawn: replaced with ISO 1628-3]

 ISO 1193:1973 Butter triers [Withdrawn: replaced with ISO 707]
 ISO 1194:1973 Cheese triers [Withdrawn: replaced with ISO 707]
 ISO/R 1195:1970 Plastics — Determination of the water vapour transmission rate of plastics films and thin sheets — Dish method [Withdrawn without replacement]

 ISO 1198:1972 Sealed-beam landing lamps for aircraft — Dimensions

 ISO/R 1200:1971 Cinematography — Labelling of containers for unexposed motion-picture films and magnetic films — Minimum information specifications [Withdrawn: replaced with ISO 3042]
 ISO 1201:1972 Cinematography — 8 mm motion-picture film with picture — Location and width of magnetic striping and gaps of recording and reproducing magnetic heads for magnetic sound record [Withdrawn without replacement]
 ISO 1202:1981 Essential oils — Determination of 1,8-cineole content [Withdrawn without replacement]
 ISO 1203:1998 Photography — Roll film cameras — Back window location
 ISO 1204:1990 Reciprocating internal combustion engines — Designation of the direction of rotation and of cylinders and valves in cylinder heads, and definition of right-hand and left-hand in-line engines and locations on an engine
 ISO 1205:1972 Reciprocating internal combustion engines — Designation of the cylinders [Withdrawn: replaced with ISO 1204]
 ISO 1206:2018 Rolling bearings — Needle roller bearings with machined rings — Boundary dimensions, geometrical product specifications (GPS) and tolerance values
 ISO 1207:2011 Slotted cheese head screws — Product grade A
 ISO 1208:1982 Spices and condiments — Determination of filth
 ISO 1209 Rigid cellular plastics — Determination of flexural properties
 ISO 1209-1:2007 Part 1: Basic bending test
 ISO 1209-2:2007 Part 2: Determination of flexural strength and apparent flexural modulus of elasticity
 ISO 1210:1992 Plastics — Determination of the burning behaviour of horizontal and vertical specimens in contact with a small-flame ignition source [Withdrawn: replaced with IEC 60695-11-10]
 ISO 1211:2010 Milk — Determination of fat content — Gravimetric method (Reference method)
 ISO 1212:1995 Apples — Cold storage
 ISO 1213 Solid mineral fuels – Vocabulary
 ISO 1213-1:2020 Part 1: Terms relating to coal preparation
 ISO 1213-2:2016 Part 2: Terms relating to sampling, testing and analysis
 ISO/R 1213-3 Vocabulary of terms relating to solid mineral fuels — Part 3: Terms relating to coke [Withdrawn: replaced with ISO 1213-2]
 ISO/R 1214:1971 Counterbalanced fork lift trucks — Rated capacity [Withdrawn without replacement]
 ISO 1215:2015 Virgin cork, raw reproduction cork, ramassage, gleanings, burnt cork, corkwaste, boiled cork pieces and raw corkwaste — Definitions and packaging
 ISO 1216:2017 Boiled reproduction cork — Grading, classification and packing
 ISO 1217:2009 Displacement compressors—Acceptance tests
 ISO 1218:1975 Plastics — Polyamides — Determination of "melting point" [Withdrawn: replaced with ISO 3146]
 ISO 1219 Fluid power systems and components – Graphical symbols and circuit diagrams
 ISO 1219-1:2012 Part 1: Graphical symbols for conventional use and data-processing applications
 ISO 1219-2:2012 Part 2: Circuit diagrams
 ISO 1219-3:2016 Part 3: Symbol modules and connected symbols in circuit diagrams
 ISO/R 1220:1970 Methods of test for heat-resisting (190 °C) electrical cables with copper conductors for aircraft [Withdrawn without replacement]

 ISO 1222 Photography – Tripod connections
 ISO 1223:2003 Cinematography — Picture areas for motion-picture films for television — Position and dimensions
 ISO 1224 Rolling bearings — Instrument precision bearings
 ISO 1224-1:2007 Part 1: Boundary dimensions, tolerances and characteristics of metric series bearings [Withdrawn without replacement]
 ISO 1224-2:2007 Part 2: Boundary dimensions, tolerances and characteristics of inch series bearings [Withdrawn without replacement]
 ISO/R 1225 was merged into ISO/R 1224.
 ISO/R 1226:1970 Symbolic designation of direction of closing and faces of doors, windows and shutters [Withdrawn without replacement]
 ISO 1227:1979 Starch, including derivatives and by-products — Vocabulary [Withdrawn without replacement]
 ISO 1228:1975 Plastics — Poly(ethylene terephthalate) in dilute solution — Determination of viscosity number [Withdrawn: replaced with ISO 1628-5]
 ISO 1229:1989 Photography — Expendable photoflash lamps — Determination of light output [Withdrawn without replacement]
 ISO 1230:2007 Photography — Determination of flash guide numbers for electronic flash equipment
 ISO/R 1231:1970 Seat belt assemblies for motorists [Withdrawn without replacement]
 ISO 1232:1976 Aluminium oxide primarily used for the production of aluminium — Determination of silica content — Reduced molybdosilicate spectrophotometric method [Withdrawn without replacement]
 ISO 1233:1975 Plastics — Determination of viscosity number of methyl methacrylate polymers and copolymers in dilute solution [Withdrawn: replaced with ISO 1628-6]
 ISO 1234:1997 Split pins

 ISO 1237:1981 Mustard seed — Specification

 ISO 1241:1996 Essential oils — Determination of ester values, before and after acetylation, and evaluation of the contents of free and total alcohols
 ISO 1242:1999 Essential oils — Determination of acid value

 ISO 1247 Aluminium pigments for paints
 ISO 1247-1:2021 Part 1: General aluminium pigments
 ISO 1247-2:2021 Part 2: Vacuum metallized aluminium pigments
 ISO 1248:2006 Iron oxide pigments — Specifications and methods of test
 ISO 1249:1974 Zinc chromate pigments — Basic zinc potassium chromate pigments and zinc tetrahydroxychromate pigments
 ISO 1250:1972 Mineral solvents for paints — White spirits and related hydrocarbon solvents
 ISO/R 1260:1970 Guide to the use of ISO/R 390 "Sampling and inspection of asbestos-cement products" [Withdrawn: replaced with ISO 390]
 ISO 1264:1980 Plastics — Homopolymer and copolymer resins of vinyl chloride — Determination of pH of aqueous extract
 ISO 1265:2007 Plastics — Poly(vinyl chloride) resins — Determination of number of impurities and foreign particles

 ISO 1268 Fibre-reinforced plastics – Methods of producing test plates
 ISO 1269:2006 Plastics — Homopolymer and copolymer resins of vinyl chloride — Determination of volatile matter (including water)
 ISO 1270:1975 Plastics — PVC resins — Determination of ash and sulphated ash [Withdrawn: replaced with ISO 3451-5]
 ISO 1271:1983 Essential oils — Determination of carbonyl value — Free hydroxylamine method
 ISO 1272:2000 Essential oils — Determination of content of phenols
 ISO 1275:2006 Double-pitch precision roller chains, attachments and associated chain sprockets for transmission and conveyors
 ISO 1279:1996 Essential oils — Determination of carbonyl value — Potentiometric methods using hydroxylammonium chloride
 ISO/TR 1281 Rolling bearings — Explanatory notes on ISO 281
 ISO/TR 1281-1:2021 Part 1: Basic dynamic load rating and basic rating life
 ISO/TR 1281-2:2008 Part 2: Modified rating life calculation, based on a systems approach to fatigue stresses
 ISO/R 1283 Brown coals and lignites — Determination of ash [Draft numbered ISO 1016]
 ISO 1288:2016 Glass in building — Determination of the bending strength of glass
 ISO 1288-1:2016 Part 1: Fundamentals of testing glass
 ISO 1288-2:2016 Part 2: Coaxial double-ring test on flat specimens with large test surface areas
 ISO 1288-3:2016 Part 3: Test with specimen supported at two points (four point bending)
 ISO 1288-4:2016 Part 4: Testing of channel shaped glass
 ISO 1288-5:2016 Part 5: Coaxial double ring test on flat specimens with small test surface areas
 ISO/R 1291 Pesticides — Common names — Ninth series of terms [Draft numbered ISO/R 967]
 ISO/R 1292 Pesticides — Common names — Eleventh series of terms [Draft numbered ISO/R 969]
 ISO/R 1295:1970 Paper vocabulary — Fifth series of terms [Withdrawn: Replaced with ISO 4046]
 ISO 1302:2002 Geometrical Product Specifications (GPS) – Indication of surface texture in technical product documentation [Withdrawn: Replaced with ISO 21920-1]
 ISO 1304:2016 Rubber compounding ingredients — Carbon black — Determination of iodine adsorption number
 ISO 1306:1995 Rubber compounding ingredients — Carbon black (pelletized) — Determination of pour density
 ISO 1307:2006 Rubber and plastics hoses — Hose sizes, minimum and maximum inside diameters, and tolerances on cut-to-length hoses
 ISO 1310:1974 Carbon black for use in the rubber industry — Sampling packaged shipments [Withdrawn: Replaced with ISO 1124]
 ISO/R 1311 Shipbuilding details — Mating dimensions for pipeline flanges for ships [Draft numbered ISO/R 964]
 ISO/R 1312 Pesticides — Common names — Twelfth series of terms [Draft numbered ISO/R 970]
 ISO/R 1313 Pesticides — Common names — Thirteenth series of terms [Draft numbered ISO/R 971]
 ISO 1324:1985 Solid wood parquet — Classification of oak strips
 ISO 1325:1973 Plastics — Determination of electrical properties of thin sheet and film [Withdrawn without replacement]
 ISO/R 1326:1970 Plastics — Determination of flammability and burning rate of plastics in the form of film [Withdrawn: Replaced with ISO 9773]
 ISO 1328 Cylindrical gears — ISO system of flank tolerance classification
 ISO 1328-1:2013 Part 1: Definitions and allowable values of deviations relevant to flanks of gear teeth
 ISO 1328-2:2020 Part 2: Definitions and allowable values of double flank radial composite deviations
 ISO/R 1330:1970 Unplasticized polyvinyl chloride (PVC) pipes — Tolerances on outside diameters [Withdrawn: replaced with ISO 3606, now ISO 11922-(1-2)]
 ISO/DIS 1331, 1332, and 1333 became ISO/R 1164, 1165, and 1166, respectively, meaning these numbers are unused.
 ISO 1336:1980 Wrought coppers (having minimum copper contents of 97,5 %) — Chemical composition and forms of wrought products [Withdrawn without replacement]
 ISO 1337:1980 Wrought coppers (having minimum copper contents of 99,85 %) — Chemical composition and forms of wrought products [Withdrawn without replacement]
 ISO 1338:1977 Cast copper alloys — Composition and mechanical properties [Withdrawn without replacement]
 ISO 1340:1976 Cylindrical gears — Information to be given to the manufacturer by the purchaser in order to obtain the gear required [Withdrawn without replacement]
 ISO 1341:1976 Straight bevel gears — Information to be given to the manufacturer by the purchaser in order to obtain the gear required [Withdrawn without replacement]
 ISO 1342:2012 Essential oil of rosemary (Rosmarinus officinalis L.)
 ISO 1346:2021 Fibre ropes — Polypropylene split film, monofilament and multifilament (PP2) and polypropylene high-tenacity multifilament (PP3) — 3-, 4-, 8- and 12-strand ropes
 ISO 1352:2021 Metallic materials — Torque-controlled fatigue testing
 ISO/R 1353 Metallic materials — Hardness test — Rockwell superficial test (scales 15N, 30N, 45N, 15T, 30T and 45T) [Draft numbered ISO 1024]
 ISO 1355:1989 Metallic materials — Hardness test — Calibration of standardized blocks to be used for Rockwell superficial hardness testing machines (scales 15N, 30N, 45N, 15T, 30T and 45T) [Withdrawn: replaced with ISO 6508-3]
 ISO/R 1359 Heat-treated steels, alloy steels and free-cutting steels – Part 4: Wrought, quenched, and tempered steels with 1 % chromium and 0.2 % molybdenum and controlled sulphur content [Renamed ISO/R 683-4]
 ISO/R 1360 Heat-treated steels, alloy steels and free-cutting steels – Part 5: Wrought quenched and tempered manganese steels [Draft renamed ISO/R 683-5]
 ISO 1361:1997 Light-gauge metal containers — Round open-top cans — Internal diameters
 ISO/R 1362 Heat-treated steels, alloy steels and free-cutting steels – Part 7: Wrought quenched and tempered chromium steels [Draft renamed ISO/R 683-7]
 ISO/R 1364 Heat-treated steels, alloy steels and free-cutting steels – Part 9: Wrought free-cutting steels [Draft renamed ISO/R 683-9]
 ISO/R 1366 Heat-treated steels, alloy steels and free-cutting steels – Part 11: Wrought case hardening steels [Draft renamed ISO/R 683-11]
 ISO/R 1376 Railway rolling stock material – Rough tyres for trailer stock Dimensions and tolerances [Draft renamed ISO/R 1005-2]
 ISO/R 1378 Railway rolling stock material – Rolled or forged wheel centres for tyred wheels for trailer stock [Draft renamed ISO/R 1005-4]
 ISO/R 1379 Railway rolling stock material – Cast wheel centres in non-alloy steel for tyred wheels for trailer stock [Draft renamed ISO/R 1005-5]
 ISO 1382:2020 Rubber – Vocabulary
 ISO 1385 Phthalate esters for industrial use — Methods of test
 ISO 1385-1:1977 Part 1: General
 ISO 1385-2:1977 Part 2: Measurement of colour after heat treatment (Diallyl phthalate excluded) [Withdrawn without replacement]
 ISO 1385-3:1977 Part 3: Determination of ash [Withdrawn without replacement]
 ISO 1385-4:1977 Part 4: Titrimetric method [Withdrawn without replacement]
 ISO 1385-5:1977 Part 5: Determination of ester content — Titrimetric method after saponification [Withdrawn without replacement]
 ISO 1386:1983 Solvent acetates for industrial use — Methods of test [Withdrawn without replacement]
 ISO 1387:1982 Methanol for industrial use — Methods of test [Withdrawn without replacement]
 ISO 1388 Ethanol for industrial use — Methods of test
 ISO 1388-1:1981 Part 1: General
 ISO 1388-2:1981 Part 2: Detection of alkalinity or determination of acidity to phenolphthalein
 ISO 1388-3:1981 Part 3: Estimation of content of carbonyl compounds present in small amounts — Photometric method
 ISO 1388-4:1981 Part 4: Estimation of content of carbonyl compounds present in moderate amounts — Titrimetric method
 ISO 1388-5:1981 Part 5: Determination of aldehydes content — Visual colorimetric method
 ISO 1388-6:1981 Part 6: Test for miscibility with water
 ISO 1388-7:1981 Part 7: Determination of methanol content (methanol contents between 0,01 and 0,20 % (V/V)) — Photometric method
 ISO 1388-8:1981 Part 8: Determination of methanol content (methanol contents between 0,10 and 1,50 % (V/V)) — Visual colorimetric method
 ISO 1388-9:1981 Part 9: Determination of esters content — Titrimetric method after saponification
 ISO 1388-10:1981 Part 10: Estimation of hydrocarbons content — Distillation method
 ISO 1388-11:1981 Part 11: Test for detection of furfural
 ISO 1388-12:1981 Part 12: Determination of permanganate time
 ISO 1389 Phthalic anhydride for industrial use — Methods of test
ISO 1389-1:1977 Part 1: General [Withdrawn without replacement]
ISO 1389-2:1977 Part 2: Measurement of colour of the molten material [Withdrawn without replacement]
ISO 1389-3:1977 Part 3: Measurement of colour stability [Withdrawn without replacement]
ISO 1389-4:1977 Part 4: Measurement of colour after treatment with sulphuric acid [Withdrawn without replacement]
ISO 1389-5:1977 Part 5: Determination of free acidity — Potentiometric method [Withdrawn without replacement]
ISO 1389-6:1977 Part 6: Determination of phthalic anhydride content — Titrimetric method [Withdrawn without replacement]
ISO 1389-7:1977 Part 7: Determination of maleic anhydride content — Polarographic method [Withdrawn without replacement]
ISO 1389-8:1977 Part 8: Determination of ash [Withdrawn without replacement]
ISO 1389-9:1977 Part 9: Determination of impurities oxidizable in the cold by potassium permanganate — Iodometric method [Withdrawn without replacement]
ISO 1389-10:1977 Part 10: Determination of 1,4- naphthaquinone content — Colorimetric method [Withdrawn without replacement]
ISO 1389-11:1977 Part 11: Determination of iron content — 2,2'- Bipyridyl photometric method [Withdrawn without replacement]
 ISO 1390 Maleic anhydride for industrial use — Methods of test
ISO 1390-1:1977 Part 1: General [Withdrawn without replacement]
ISO 1390-2:1977 Part 2: Measurement of colour of the molten material [Withdrawn without replacement]
ISO 1390-3:1977 Part 3: Determination of free acidity — Potentiometric method [Withdrawn without replacement]
ISO 1390-4:1977 Part 4: Determination of maleic anhydride content — Polarographic method [Withdrawn without replacement]
ISO 1390-5:1977 Part 5: Determination of ash [Withdrawn without replacement]
ISO 1390-6:1977 Part 6: Determination of iron content — 2,2'- Bipyridyl photometric method [Withdrawn without replacement]
 ISO 1391 Paraformaldehyde for industrial use — Methods of test
ISO 1391-1:1976 Part 1: General [Withdrawn without replacement]
ISO 1391-2:1976 Part 2: Determination of ash [Withdrawn without replacement]
ISO 1391-3:1976 Part 3: Determination of iron content — 2,2'- Bipyridyl photometric method [Withdrawn without replacement]
ISO 1391-4:1976 Part 4: Determination of water-insoluble matter [Withdrawn without replacement]
 ISO 1392:1977 Determination of crystallizing point — General method
 ISO 1393:1977 Liquid halogenated hydrocarbons for industrial use — Determination of acidity — Titrimetric method [Withdrawn without replacement]
 ISO 1394:1977 Liquid halogenated hydrocarbons for industrial use — Determination of cloud point [Withdrawn without replacement]
 ISO 1395:1977 Short pitch transmission precision bush chains and chain wheels [Withdrawn without replacement]
 ISO 1396:1975 Vulcanized and unvulcanized compounded rubber — Determination of copper content — Zinc diethyldithiocarbamate photometric method [Withdrawn: replaced with ISO 8053]
 ISO 1397:1975 Compounded rubber — Determination of manganese content — Sodium periodate photometric method [Withdrawn: replaced with ISO 7780]
 ISO/R 1398:1970 Rubber seals — Joint rings in asbestos-cement water piping [Withdrawn: replaced with ISO 4633]
 ISO 1399:1982 Rubber, vulcanized — Determination of permeability to gases — Constant volume method [Withdrawn: replaced with ISO 2782]
 ISO 1400:1975 Vulcanized rubbers of high hardness (85 to 100 IRHD) — Determination of hardness [Withdrawn: replaced with ISO 48, now ISO 48-2]
 ISO 1401:2016 Rubber hoses for agricultural spraying
 ISO 1402:2021 Rubber and plastics hoses and hose assemblies – Hydrostatic testing
 ISO 1403:2019 Rubber hoses, textile-reinforced, for general-purpose water applications — Specification
 ISO/R 1404:1970 Industrial air hose [Withdrawn: replaced with ISO 2398]
 ISO 1407:2011 Rubber — Determination of solvent extract
 ISO 1408:1995 Rubber — Determination of carbon black content — Pyrolytic and chemical degradation methods
 ISO 1409:2020 Plastics/rubber — Polymer dispersions and rubber latices (natural and synthetic) — Determination of surface tension
 ISO 1413:2016 Horology – Shock-resistant wrist watches
 ISO/TR 1417:1974 Automobiles — Anchorages for seat belts [Withdrawn without replacement]
 ISO 1419:2019 Rubber- or plastics-coated fabrics — Accelerated-ageing tests
 ISO 1420:2016 Rubber- or plastics-coated fabrics — Determination of resistance to penetration by water
 ISO 1421:2016 Rubber- or plastics-coated fabrics — Determination of tensile strength and elongation at break
 ISO/R 1428:1971 Fire-refined high-conductivity tough pitch copper refinery shapes [Withdrawn: replaced with ISO 431]
 ISO/R 1429:1971 Fire-refined tough pitch copper refinery shapes [Withdrawn: replaced with ISO 431]
 ISO/R 1430:1971 Phosphorus-deoxidized copper — Refinery shapes [Withdrawn: replaced with ISO 431]
 ISO 1431 Rubber, vulcanized or thermoplastic — Resistance to ozone cracking
 ISO 1431-1:2012 Part 1: Static and dynamic strain testing
 ISO 1431-2:1994 Part 2: Dynamic strain test [Withdrawn: replaced with ISO 1431-1]
 ISO 1431-3:2017 Part 3: Reference and alternative methods for determining the ozone concentration in laboratory test chambers
 ISO 1432:2021 Rubber, vulcanized or thermoplastic — Determination of low-temperature stiffening (Gehman test)
 ISO 1433:1995 Rubber, vulcanized — Preferred gradations of properties [Withdrawn without replacement]
 ISO 1434:2016 Natural rubber in bales — Amount of bale coating — Determination
 ISO 1435:1996 Rubber compounding ingredients — Carbon black (pelletized) — Determination of fines content
 ISO 1436:2020 Rubber hoses and hose assemblies — Wire-braid-reinforced hydraulic types for oil-based or water-based fluids — Specification
 ISO 1437:2017 Rubber compounding ingredients — Carbon black — Determination of sieve residue
 ISO 1438:2017 Hydrometry – Open channel flow measurement using thin-plate weirs
 ISO/R 1439 Refractory arch bricks — Dimensions [Draft numbered ISO/R 1145]
 ISO 1440 Pyrometric reference cones for laboratory use – Specification [Draft numbered ISO/R 1146]
 ISO 1442:1997 Meat and meat products — Determination of moisture content (Reference method)
 ISO 1443:1973 Meat and meat products — Determination of total fat content
 ISO 1444:1996 Meat and meat products — Determination of free fat content
 ISO 1446:2001 Green coffee — Determination of water content — Basic reference method
 ISO 1447:1978 Green coffee — Determination of moisture content (Routine method) [Withdrawn without replacement]
 ISO 1452 Plastics piping systems for water supply and for buried and above-ground drainage and sewerage under pressure — Unplasticized poly(vinyl chloride) (PVC-U)
 ISO 1452-1:2009 Part 1: General
 ISO 1452-2:2009 Part 2: Pipes
 ISO 1452-3:2009 Part 3: Fittings
 ISO 1452-4:2009 Part 4: Valves
 ISO 1452-5:2009 Part 5: Fitness for purpose of the system
 ISO/R 1453 Adding machines and calculating machines — Numeric section of ten-key keyboards [Draft numbered ISO/R 1092]
 ISO/R 1454 Adding machines and calculating machines — Keytop and printed or displayed symbols [Draft numbered ISO/R 1093]
 ISO/R 1455:1969 Adding machines and calculating machines — Classification [Draft numbered ISO/R 1094]
 ISO 1456:2009 Metallic and other inorganic coatings — Electrodeposited coatings of nickel, nickel plus chromium, copper plus nickel and of copper plus nickel plus chromium
 ISO 1457:1974 Metallic coatings — Electroplated coatings of copper plus nickel plus chromium on iron or steel [Withdrawn: replaced with ISO 1456]
 ISO 1458:2002 Metallic coatings — Electrodeposited coatings of nickel [Withdrawn: replaced with ISO 1456]
 ISO 1459:1973 Metallic coatings — Protection against corrosion by hot dip galvanizing — Guiding principles [Withdrawn: replaced with ISO 1461]
 ISO 1460:2020 Metallic coatings — Hot dip galvanized coatings on ferrous materials — Gravimetric determination of the mass per unit area
 ISO 1461:2009 Hot dip galvanized coatings on fabricated iron and steel articles — Specifications and test methods
 ISO 1462:1973 Metallic coatings — Coatings other than those anodic to the basis metal — Accelerated corrosion tests — Method for the evaluation of the results [Withdrawn: replaced with ISO 10289]
 ISO 1463:2021 Metallic and oxide coatings — Measurement of coating thickness — Microscopical method
 ISO 1464:2018 Aerospace — Tripod jacks — Clearance dimensions
 ISO 1465:1989 Aircraft — Liquid oxygen replenishment couplings — Mating dimensions
 ISO 1466:1973 Lever-operated manual switches for aircraft — Performance requirements
 ISO 1467:1973 General purpose push-pull single-pole circuit-breakers for aircraft — Performance requirements
 ISO/R 1468:1970 Methods of test for general purpose electrical cables with aluminium or aluminium alloy conductors for aircraft [Withdrawn without replacement]
 ISO/R 1469:1969 Finishes with the external screw thread for glass containers and gauges for inspection of screw closures [Draft numbered ISO 1115]
 ISO 1472:1977 Textile machinery and accessories — Cylindrical tubes for draw-twisters — Dimensions and permissible run-out [Withdrawn without replacement]
 ISO 1478:1999 Tapping screws thread
 ISO 1479:2011 Hexagon head tapping screws
 ISO/R 1480:1970 Hexagon head tapping screws — Inch series [Withdrawn without replacement]
 ISO 1481:2011 Slotted pan head tapping screws
 ISO 1482:2011 Slotted countersunk (flat) head tapping screws
 ISO 1483:2011 Slotted raised countersunk (oval) head tapping screws
 ISO/R 1488 Dimensions of elastometric toroidal sealing rings for pipe-fittings in aircraft (Inch series – Class 1 tolerances) [Draft numbered ISO/R 1077]
 ISO/R 1489 Dimensions of elastometric toroidal sealing rings for aircraft (Inch series – Class 1 tolerances) [Draft numbered ISO/R 1078]
 ISO/R 1490:1970 Performance requirements for heat-resisting (260 °C) electrical cables with copper conductors for aircraft [Withdrawn without replacement]
 ISO/R 1491:1970 Methods of test for heat-resisting (260 °C) electrical cables with copper conductors for aircraft [Withdrawn without replacement]
 ISO/R 1494 Steel tubes — Butt-welding bends 5D (90° and 180°) [Draft numbered ISO/R 1128]
 ISO 1496 Series 1 freight containers — Specification and testing
 ISO 1496-1:2013 Part 1: General cargo containers for general purposes
 ISO 1496-2:2018 Part 2: Thermal containers
 ISO 1496-3:2019 Part 3: Tank containers for liquids, gases and pressurized dry bulk
 ISO 1496-4:1991 Part 4: Non-pressurized containers for dry bulk
 ISO 1496-5:2018 Part 5: Platform and platform-based containers

ISO 1500 – ISO 1999 
 ISO 1501:2009 ISO miniature screw threads
 ISO 1502:1996 ISO general-purpose metric screw threads – Gauges and gauging
 ISO 1503:2008 Spatial orientation and direction of movement — Ergonomic requirements
 ISO 1505:1993 Textile machinery — Widths relating to dyeing and finishing machines — Definitions and range of nominal widths
 ISO 1506:1982 Textile machinery – Dyeing, finishing and allied machinery – Classification and nomenclature [Withdrawn without replacement]
 ISO/R 1508 Pesticides — Common names — Fourteenth series of terms [Draft numbered ISO/R 1062]
 ISO 1509:1973 General purpose push-pull three-pole circuit-breakers for aircraft — Performance requirements
 ISO/R 1511:1970 Protective helmets for road users [Withdrawn without replacement]
 ISO 1512:1991 Paints and varnishes — Sampling of products in liquid or paste form [Withdrawn: replaced with ISO 15528]
 ISO 1513:2010 Paints and varnishes — Examination and preparation of test samples
 ISO 1514:2016 Paints and varnishes — Standard panels for testing
 ISO 1515:1973 Paints and varnishes — Determination of volatile and non-volatile matter [Withdrawn: replaced with ISO 3251]
 ISO 1516:2002 Determination of flash/no flash — Closed cup equilibrium method
 ISO 1517:1973 Paints and varnishes — Surface-drying test — Ballotini method [Withdrawn: replaced with ISO 9117-3]
 ISO 1518 Paints and varnishes — Determination of scratch resistance
 ISO 1518-1:2019 Part 1: Constant-loading method
 ISO 1518-2:2019 Part 2: Variable-loading method
 ISO 1519:2011 Paints and varnishes — Bend test (cylindrical mandrel)
 ISO 1520:2006 Paints and varnishes — Cupping test
 ISO 1521:1973 Paints and varnishes — Determination of resistance to water — Water immersion method [Withdrawn: replaced with ISO 2812-2]
 ISO 1522:2006 Paints and varnishes — Pendulum damping test
 ISO 1523:2002 Determination of flash point — Closed cup equilibrium method
 ISO 1524:2020 Paints, varnishes and printing inks — Determination of fineness of grind
 ISO 1530:2003 Fishing nets — Description and designation of knotted netting
 ISO 1531:1973 Fishing nets – Hanging of netting – Basic terms and definitions
 ISO 1532:1973 Fishing nets – Cutting knotted netting to shape ("tapering")
 ISO/R 1534:1970 Protective helmets for motor motorists' set belts with retractors [Withdrawn without replacement]
 ISO 1535:1975 Continuous mechanical handling equipment for loose bulk materials — Troughed belt conveyors (other than portable conveyors) — Belts
 ISO 1536:1975 Continuous mechanical handling equipment for loose bulk materials — Troughed belt conveyors (other than portable conveyors) — Belt pulleys
 ISO 1537:1975 Continuous mechanical handling equipment for loose bulk materials — Troughed belt conveyors (other than portable conveyors) — Idlers
 ISO 1538:1984 Programming languages – ALGOL 60
 ISO/IEC 1539 Information technology – Programming languages – Fortran
 ISO/IEC 1539-1:2018 Part 1: Base language
 ISO/IEC 1539-2:2000 Part 2: Varying length character strings
 ISO/IEC 1539-3:1999 Part 3: Conditional compilation [Withdrawn without replacement]
 ISO 1540:2006 Aerospace — Characteristics of aircraft electrical systems
 ISO/R 1542:1971 Nomenclature of terms used in the benzole industry- Part I [Withdrawn: replaced with ISO 1543, now withdrawn without replacement]
 ISO 1543:1981 Benzole industry — Vocabulary [Withdrawn without replacement]
 ISO 1546:1981 Procedure for milk recording for cows [Withdrawn without replacement]
 ISO 1547:1975 Aircraft — Precision fuse-links — General requirements
 ISO 1548:1976 Aircraft — Precision fuse-links — Type A
 ISO 1549:1976 Aircraft — Precision fuse-links — Type B
 ISO 1550:1973 Potassium hydroxide for industrial use — Determination of sodium content — Flame emission spectrophotometric method
 ISO/R 1551:1970 Potassium hydroxide for industrial use — Determination of sodium content — Gravimetric method using uranyl acetate and magnesium acetate [Withdrawn without replacement]
 ISO 1552:1976 Liquid chlorine for industrial use — Method of sampling (for determining only the volumetric chlorine content)
 ISO 1553:1976 Unalloyed copper containing not less than 99,90 % of copper — Determination of copper content — Electrolytic method [Withdrawn without replacement]
 ISO 1554:1976 Wrought and cast copper alloys — Determination of copper content — Electrolytic method
 ISO/R 1555:1971 Copper and copper alloy rolled flat products (thickness less than 2,5 mm (0.1 in)) — Tensile test [Withdrawn: replaced with ISO 6892-1]
 ISO/R 1556:1971 Copper and copper alloy tubes of circular section — Flattening Test [Withdrawn: replaced with ISO 8492]
 ISO 1559:1995 Dental materials — Alloys for dental amalgam [Withdrawn: replaced with ISO 24234]
 ISO 1560:1985 Dental mercury [Withdrawn: replaced with ISO 24234]
 ISO 1561:1995 Dental casting wax [Withdrawn: replaced with ISO 15854]
 ISO 1562:2004 Dentistry — Casting gold alloys [Withdrawn: replaced with ISO 22674]
 ISO 1563:1990 Dental alginate impression material [Withdrawn: replaced with ISO 21563]
 ISO 1564:1995 Dental aqueous impression materials based on agar [Withdrawn: replaced with ISO 21563]
 ISO 1565:1978 Dental silicate cement (hand mixed) [Withdrawn: replaced with ISO 9917]
 ISO 1566:1978 Dental zinc phosphate cement [Withdrawn: replaced with ISO 9917]
 ISO 1567:1999 Dentistry — Denture base polymers [Withdrawn: replaced with ISO 20795-1]
 ISO 1570:1975 Zinc and zinc alloys — Determination of tin content — Spectrophotometric method [Withdrawn without replacement]
 ISO/R 1571:1970 Shanks for pneumatic tools and fitting dimensions of chuck bushings — Part II
 ISO 1572:1980 Tea — Preparation of ground sample of known dry matter content
 ISO 1573:1980 Tea — Determination of loss in mass at 103 degrees C
 ISO 1574:1980 Tea — Determination of water extract [Withdrawn: replaced with ISO 9768]
 ISO 1575:1987 Tea — Determination of total ash
 ISO 1576:1988 Tea — Determination of water-soluble ash and water-insoluble ash
 ISO 1577:1987 Tea — Determination of acid-insoluble ash
 ISO 1578:1975 Tea — Determination of alkalinity of water-soluble ash
 ISO 1580:2011 Slotted pan head screws — Product grade A
 ISO 1585:2020 Road vehicles — Engine test code — Net power
 ISO 1586:1977 Textile machinery and accessories – Shuttles – Terms and designation in relation to the position of the shuttle eye
 ISO 1587:1975 Gypsum rock for the manufacture of binders — Specifications [Withdrawn without replacement]
 ISO/R 1588:1971 Binders based on calcium sulphate — Definitions, classification, and nomenclature [Withdrawn without replacement]
 ISO/R 1589 Rivet shank diameters [Draft numbered ISO 1051]
 ISO 1592:1977 Urea for industrial use — Determination of nitrogen content — Titrimetric method after distillation [Withdrawn without replacement]
 ISO 1593:1977 Urea for industrial use — Determination of alkalinity — Titrimetric method [Withdrawn without replacement]
 ISO 1594:1977 Urea for industrial use — Determination of ash
 ISO/R 1595:1970 Urea for industrial use — Determination of iron content — 2,2'- Bipyridyl photometric method
 ISO 1597:1994 Plastics — Unplasticized cellulose acetate — Determination of acetic acid yield [Withdrawn without replacement]
 ISO 1598:1990 Plastics – Cellulose acetate — Determination of insoluble particles
 ISO 1599:1990 Plastics — Cellulose acetate — Determination of viscosity loss on moulding
 ISO 1600:1990 Plastics — Cellulose acetate — Determination of light absorption on moulded specimens produced using different periods of heating
 ISO 1604:1989 Belt drives — Endless wide V-belts for industrial speed-changers and groove profiles for corresponding pulleys
 ISO 1607 Positive-displacement vacuum pumps — Measurement of performance characteristics
 ISO 1607-1:1993 Part 1: Measurement of volume rate of flow (pumping speed) [Withdrawn: replaced with ISO 21360-2]
 ISO 1607-2:1989 Part 2: Measurement of ultimate pressure [Withdrawn: replaced with ISO 21360-2]
 ISO 1608 Vapour vacuum pumps — Measurement of performance characteristics
 ISO 1608-1:1993 Part 1: Measurement of volume rate of flow (pumping speed)
 ISO 1608-2:1989 Part 2: Measurement of critical backing pressure
 ISO 1609:2020 Vacuum technology — Dimensions of non-knife edge flanges
 ISO 1614:1976 Glycerines for industrial use — Samples and test methods — General [Withdrawn without replacement]
 ISO 1615:1976 Glycerines for industrial use — Determination of alkalinity or acidity — Titrimetric method [Withdrawn without replacement]
 ISO 1616:1976 Glycerines for industrial use — Determination of sulphated ash — Gravimetric method [Withdrawn without replacement]
 ISO 1617:1976 Aluminium oxide primarily used for the production of aluminium — Determination of sodium content — Flame emission spectrophotometric method [Withdrawn without replacement]
 ISO 1618:1976 Aluminium oxide primarily used for the production of aluminium — Determination of vanadium content — N-Benzoyl-N-phenylhydroxylamine photometric method [Withdrawn without replacement]
 ISO 1619:1976 Cryolite, natural and artificial — Preparation and storage of test samples
 ISO 1620:1976 Cryolite, natural and artificial — Determination of silica content — Reduced molybdosilicate spectrophotometric method
 ISO 1622 Plastics — Polystyrene (PS) moulding and extrusion materials
 ISO 1622-1:2012 Part 1: Designation system and basis for specifications [Withdrawn: replaced with ISO 24022-1]
 ISO 1622-2:1995 Part 2: Preparation of test specimens and determination of properties [Withdrawn: replaced with ISO 24022-2]
 ISO 1624:2001 Plastics — Vinyl chloride homopolymer and copolymer resins — Sieve analysis in water
 ISO 1625:1998 Plastics — Polymer dispersions — Determination of non-volatile matter (residue) at specified temperatures [Withdrawn: replaced with ISO 3251]
 ISO/R 1627:1970 Plastics — Method of test to determine the change in electrical properties of polyethylene due to the migration of plasticizers [Withdrawn without replacement]
 ISO 1628 Plastics — Determination of the viscosity of polymers in dilute solution using capillary viscometers
 ISO 1628-1:2021 Part 1: General principles
 ISO 1628-2:2020 Part 2: Poly(vinyl chloride) resins
 ISO 1628-3:2010 Part 3: Polyethylenes and polypropylenes
 ISO 1628-4:1999 Part 4: Polycarbonate (PC) moulding and extrusion materials
 ISO 1628-5:1998 Part 5: Thermoplastic polyester (TP) homopolymers and copolymers
 ISO 1628-6:1990 Part 6: Methyl methacrylate polymers
 ISO 1629:2013 Rubber and latices – Nomenclature
 ISO 1634 Wrought copper and copper alloy plate, sheet and strip
 ISO 1634-1:1987 Part 1: Technical conditions of delivery for plate, sheet and strip for general purposes [Withdrawn without replacement]
 ISO 1634-2:1987 Part 2: Technical conditions of delivery for plate and sheet for boilers, pressure vessels and heat-exchangers [Withdrawn without replacement]
 ISO 1634-3:1987 Part 3: Technical conditions of delivery for wrought copper alloy strip for springs [Withdrawn without replacement]
 ISO 1635:1974 Wrought copper and copper alloys — Round tubes for general purposes — Mechanical properties [Withdrawn without replacement]
 ISO 1637:1987 Wrought copper and copper alloy rod and bar — Technical conditions of delivery [Withdrawn without replacement]
 ISO 1638:1987 Wrought copper and copper alloy wire — Technical conditions of delivery [Withdrawn without replacement]
 ISO 1639:1974 Wrought copper alloys — Extruded sections — Mechanical properties [Withdrawn without replacement]
 ISO 1640:1974 Wrought copper alloys — Forgings — Mechanical properties [Withdrawn without replacement]
 ISO 1641 End mills and slot drills
 ISO 1641-1:2016 Part 1: Milling cutters with cylindrical shanks
 ISO 1641-2:2011 Part 2: Dimensions and designation of milling cutters with Morse taper shanks
 ISO 1641-3:2011 Part 3: Dimensions and designation of milling cutters with 7/24 taper shanks
 ISO 1642:1987 Plastics — Industrial laminated sheets based on thermosetting resins — Specification [Withdrawn without replacement]
 ISO/R 1646:1970 Rolling bearings — Double row self-aligning ball bearings — Radial internal clearance [Withdrawn: replaced with ISO 5753]
 ISO/R 1648:1971 Rolling bearings — Radial bearings with shields or seals — Outside diameter tolerances — Normal tolerance class and tolerance class 6 [Withdrawn: Replaced with ISO 492]
 ISO 1651:1974 Tube drawing mandrels
 ISO 1652:2011 Rubber latex — Determination of apparent viscosity by the Brookfield test method
 ISO 1653:1975 Vulcanized rubbers — Determination of compression set under constant deflection at low temperatures [Withdrawn: replaced with ISO 815, later ISO 815-(1-2)]
 ISO/R 1654:1971 Raw rubber and rubber latex — Determination of copper [Withdrawn: replaced with ISO 8053]
 ISO 1655:1975 Raw rubber and rubber latex — Determination of manganese content — Potassium periodate photometric method [Withdrawn: replaced with ISO 7780]
 ISO 1656:2019 Rubber, raw natural, and rubber latex, natural — Determination of nitrogen content
 ISO 1657:1986 Rubber, raw and rubber latex — Determination of iron content — 1,10-Phenanthroline photometric method
 ISO 1658:2015 Natural rubber (NR) — Evaluation procedure
 ISO/R 1659 Layout of multilingual classified vocabularies [Draft numbered ISO/R 1149]
 ISO 1660:2017 Geometrical product specifications (GPS) – Geometrical tolerancing – Profile tolerancing
 ISO/R 1661:1971 Technical drawings – Tolerances of form and position – Part IV: Practical examples of indications on drawings. [Withdrawn without replacement]
 ISO/R 1662:1971 Refrigerating plants — Safety requirements [Withdrawn: replaced with ISO 5149, later ISO 5149-(1-4)]
 ISO 1663:2007 Rigid cellular plastics – Determination of water vapour transmission properties
 ISO 1666:1996 Starch — Determination of moisture content — Oven-drying method
 ISO/TR 1672:1977 Hardware representation of ALGOL basic symbols in the ISO 7- bit coded character set for information processing interchange [Withdrawn without replacement]
 ISO 1673:1991 Onions — Guide to storage
 ISO 1675:1985 Plastics — Liquid resins — Determination of density by the pyknometer method
 ISO 1677:1977 Sealed radioactive sources — General [Withdrawn: replaced with ISO 2919]
 ISO 1679:1973 Data processing — Implementation of the ISO 7- bit coded character set on punched cards [Withdrawn: replaced with ISO 6586]
 ISO 1680:2013 Acoustics – Test code for the measurement of airborne noise emitted by rotating electrical machines
 ISO 1681:1973 Information processing – Unpunched paper cards – Specification
 ISO 1682:1973 Information processing — 80 columns punched paper cards — Dimensions and location of rectangular punched holes [Withdrawn without replacement]
 ISO 1683:2015 Acoustics – Preferred reference values for acoustical and vibratory levels
 ISO 1684:1975 Wire, bar and tube drawing dies — Specifications
 ISO/R 1685:1971 Shipbuilding details — Multi-purpose chocks of cast steel [Withdrawn without replacement]
 ISO 1686:1976 Sodium and potassium silicates for industrial use — Samples and methods of test — General
 ISO 1687:1976 Sodium and potassium silicates for industrial use — Determination of density at 20 degrees C of products in solution — Method using density hydrometer and method using pyknometer [Withdrawn without replacement]
 ISO 1688:1976 Sodium and potassium silicates for industrial use — Determination of dry matter — Gravimetric method [Withdrawn without replacement]
 ISO 1689:1976 Sodium and potassium silicates for industrial use — Calculation of the ratio : silicon dioxide/sodium oxide or silicon dioxide/potassium oxide
 ISO 1690:1976 Sodium and potassium silicates for industrial use — Determination of silica content — Gravimetric method by insolubilization
 ISO 1691:1976 Sodium and potassium silicates for industrial use — Determination of carbonates content — Gas-volumetric method
 ISO 1692:1976 Sodium and potassium silicates for industrial use — Determination of total alkalinity — Titrimetric method
 ISO 1693:1976 Cryolite, natural and artificial — Determination of fluorine content — Modified Willard-Winter method
 ISO 1694:1976 Cryolite, natural and artificial — Determination of iron content — 1,10- Phenanthroline photometric method
 ISO 1695:1977 o-Chlorotoluene for industrial use — List of methods of test [Withdrawn without replacement]
 ISO 1696:1977 p-Chlorotoluene for industrial use — List of methods of test [Withdrawn without replacement]
 ISO 1697:1977 Chlorobenzene for industrial use — List of methods of test [Withdrawn without replacement]
 ISO 1698:1977 o-Dichlorobenzene for industrial use — List of methods of test [Withdrawn without replacement]
 ISO 1699:1977 P-Dichlorobenzene for industrial use — List of methods of test [Withdrawn without replacement]
 ISO 1700:1988 Cinematography — 8 mm Type S motion-picture raw stock film — Cutting and perforating dimensions
 ISO 1701 Test conditions for milling machines with table of variable height — Testing of the accuracy
 ISO 1701-0:1984 Part 0: General introduction [Withdrawn: replaced with ISO 1701-1 and ISO 1701-2]
 ISO 1701-1:2004 Part 1: Machines with horizontal spindle
 ISO 1701-2:2004 Part 2: Machines with vertical spindle
 ISO 1703:2005 Assembly tools for screws and nuts – Designation and nomenclature
 ISO 1704:2008 Ships and marine technology — Stud-link anchor chains
 ISO/R 1707:1970 Formic acid for industrial use — Determination of iron content — 2,2'- Bipyridyl photometric method [Withdrawn: replaced with ISO 731-6, now withdrawn without replacement]
 ISO 1708:1989 Acceptance conditions for general purpose parallel lathes — Testing of the accuracy
 ISO 1709:2018 Nuclear energy — Fissile materials — Principles of criticality safety in storing, handling and processing
 ISO/R 1710:1970 Fundamental principles for protection in the design and construction of installations for work on unsealed radioactive materials [Withdrawn without replacement]
 ISO 1711 Assembly tools for screws and nuts — Technical specifications
 ISO 1711-1:2019 Part 1: Hand-operated wrenches and sockets
 ISO 1711-2:2019 Part 2: Machine-operated sockets (impact)
 ISO/R 1713:1970 Restraining devices for children in motor vehicles
 ISO 1716:2018 Reaction to fire tests for products — Determination of the gross heat of combustion (calorific value)
 ISO 1717:1974 Rock drilling — Rotary drill-rods and rotary drill-bits for dry drilling — Connecting dimensions
 ISO 1718:1991 Rock drilling equipment — Drill rods with tapered connection for percussive drilling
 ISO 1719:1974 Rock drilling — Extension drill-steel equipment for percussive long-hole drilling — Rope-threaded equipments 7/8 to 1 1/4 in (22 to 32 mm) [Withdrawn: replaced with ISO 10207 and ISO 10208]
 ISO 1720:1974 Rock drilling — Extension drill-steel equipment for percussive long-hole drilling — Rope-threaded equipments 1 1/2 to 2 in (38 to 51 mm) [Withdrawn: replaced with ISO 10207 and ISO 10208]
 ISO 1721:1974 Rock drilling — Extension drill-steel equipment for percussive long-hole drilling — Reverse-buttress-threaded equipments 1 1/16 and 1 1/4 in (27 and 32 mm)
 ISO 1722:1974 Rock drilling — Extension drill-steel equipment for percussive long-hole drilling — Reverse-buttress-threaded equipments 1 1/2 to 2 1/2 in (38 to 64 mm)
 ISO 1724:2003 Road vehicles — Connectors for the electrical connection of towing and towed vehicles — 7-pole connector type 12 N (normal) for vehicles with 12 V nominal supply voltage
 ISO 1726 Road vehicles — Mechanical coupling between tractors and semi-trailers
 ISO 1726-1:2000 Part 1: Interchangeability between tractors and semi-trailers for general cargo
 ISO 1726-2:2007 Part 2: Interchangeability between low-coupling tractors and high-volume semi-trailers
 ISO 1726-3:2010 Part 3: Requirements for semi-trailer contact area to fifth wheel
 ISO/R 1727:1970 Pressures in brake lines and braking efficiency [Draft numbered ISO 1186]
 ISO 1728:2006 Road vehicles — Pneumatic braking connections between motor vehicles and towed vehicles — Interchangeability
 ISO 1729:1973 Information processing — Unpunched paper tape — Specification [Withdrawn without replacement]
 ISO 1730:1980 Dictation equipment – Basic operating requirements
 ISO/R 1731:1971 Dictation equipment – Classification
 ISO 1736:2008 Dried milk and dried milk products — Determination of fat content — Gravimetric method (Reference method)
 ISO 1737:2008 Evaporated milk and sweetened condensed milk — Determination of fat content — Gravimetric method (Reference method)
 ISO 1738:2004 Butter — Determination of salt content
 ISO 1739:2006 Butter — Determination of the refractive index of the fat (Reference method)
 ISO 1740:2004 Milkfat products and butter — Determination of fat acidity (Reference method)
 ISO 1741:1980 Dextrose — Determination of loss in mass on drying — Vacuum oven method
 ISO 1742:1980 Glucose syrups — Determination of dry matter — Vacuum oven method
 ISO 1743:1982 Glucose syrup — Determination of dry matter content — Refractive index method
 ISO 1745:1975 Information processing – Basic mode control procedures for data communication systems
 ISO 1746:1998 Rubber or plastics hoses and tubing — Bending tests [Withdrawn: replaced with ISO 10619-1]
 ISO 1747:1976 Rubber, vulcanized — Determination of adhesion to rigid plates in shear — Quadruple shear method [Withdrawn: replaced with ISO 1827]
 ISO/R 1748 Shipbuilding details – Wrought aluminium alloys for use in shipbuilding [Draft numbered ISO/R 1156]
 ISO 1749:1973 Aircraft — Elastomeric sealing rings — Packaging and identification [Withdrawn without replacement]
 ISO 1750:1981 Pesticides and other agrochemicals – Common names
 ISO 1751:2012 Ships and marine technology — Ships' side scuttles
 ISO 1753:1975 Cinematography — Recording and reproducing head gaps for six-track magnetic sound records on 35 mm motion-picture film containing no picture — Positions and width dimensions [Withdrawn: replaced with ISO 162]
 ISO 1754:2010 Photography — Cameras using 35 mm film and roll film — Dimensions of picture sizes
 ISO 1755:1987 Photography — Projector slides — Dimensions
 ISO 1756:1975 Industrial trucks — Dimensions of stillages — Connection gauge
 ISO 1757:1996 Personal photographic dosemeters [Withdrawn without replacement]
 ISO 1758:1976 Direct-reading electroscope-type pocket exposure meters [Withdrawn: replaced with ISO 11934, now withdrawn without replacement]
 ISO 1759:1976 Indirect-reading capacitor-type pocket exposure meters and accessory electrometers [Withdrawn: replaced with ISO 11934, now withdrawn without replacement]
 ISO/R 1761:1970 Acoustics — Procedure for describing aircraft noise heard on the ground using spectral analysis [Withdrawn: replaced with ISO 3891, now withdrawn without replacement]
 ISO 1762:2019 Paper, board, pulps and cellulose nanomaterials — Determination of residue (ash content) on ignition at 525 °C
 ISO 1763:2020 Textile floor coverings — Determination of number of tufts and/or loops per unit length and per unit area
 ISO 1764:1975 Textile floor coverings — Determination of mass per unit area of machine made textile floor coverings [Withdrawn: replaced with ISO 8543]
 ISO 1765:1986 Machine-made textile floor coverings — Determination of thickness
 ISO 1766:1999 Textile floor coverings — Determination of thickness of pile above the substrate
 ISO/R 1767:1971 Rubber — Determination of rebound resilience of vulcanizates [Withdrawn: replaced with ISO 4662]
 ISO 1768:1975 Glass hydrometers – Conventional value for the thermal cubic expansion coefficient (for use in the preparation of measurement tables for liquids)
 ISO 1769:1975 Laboratory glassware – Pipettes – Colour coding
 ISO 1770:1981 Solid-stem general purpose thermometers [Withdrawn without replacement]
 ISO 1771:1981 Enclosed-scale general purpose thermometers [Withdrawn without replacement]
 ISO 1772:1975 Laboratory crucibles in porcelain and silica
 ISO 1773:1997 Laboratory glassware — Narrow-necked boiling flasks
 ISO 1775:1975 Porcelain laboratory apparatus — Requirements and methods of test
 ISO 1776:1985 Glass — Resistance to attack by hydrochloric acid at 100 degrees C — Flame emission or flame atomic absorption spectrometric method
 ISO 1780:1984 Cinematography — Motion-picture camera cartridge, 8 mm Type S Model I — Aperture, camera aperture profile, film position, pressure pad and pressure pad flatness — Dimensions and specifications
 ISO 1781:1983 Cinematography — Projector usage of 8 mm Type S motion-picture film for direct front projection
 ISO 1783:1973 Magnesium alloys — Determination of zinc — Volumetric method
 ISO 1784:1976 Aluminium alloys — Determination of zinc — EDTA titrimetric method
 ISO 1785:1983 Cinematography — Printed 8 mm, Type S, image area on 16 mm motion-picture film perforated 8 mm, Type S (1-4) — Position and dimensions
 ISO/R 1786:1970 Statistics — Vocabulary and symbols — Second series [Withdrawn: replaced with ISO 3534]
 ISO 1787:1984 Cinematography — Camera usage of 8 mm Type S motion-picture film — Specifications
 ISO 1788 Specification for compostable plastics [Rejected draft]
 ISO 1789:1983 Building construction — Modular co-ordination — Storey heights and room heights for residential buildings [Withdrawn: replaced with ISO 6512, now replaced with ISO 21723]
 ISO/R 1790:1970 Building construction – Modular co-ordination – Reference lines of horizontal controlling co-ordinating dimensions [Withdrawn: replaced with ISO 2848]
 ISO 1791:1983 Building construction – Modular co-ordination – Vocabulary [Withdrawn: replaced with ISO 6707-1]
 ISO 1793:2005 Cinematography — Reels for 16 mm motion-picture projectors (up to and including 610 m capacity: 38 cm size) — Dimensions
 ISO/R 1794:1971 Cellular plastics and rubbers — Determination of linear dimensions [Withdrawn: replaced with ISO 1923]
 ISO 1795:2017 Rubber, raw natural and raw synthetic — Sampling and further preparative procedures
 ISO 1796:1982 Rubber, raw — Sample preparation [Withdrawn: replaced with ISO 1795]
 ISO 1797:2017 Dentistry — Shanks for rotary and oscillating instruments
 ISO 1798:2008 Flexible cellular polymeric materials — Determination of tensile strength and elongation at break
 ISO/R 1799:1971 Dimensions of elastomeric toroidal sealing rings for pipe-fittings in aircraft [Withdrawn without replacement]
 ISO/R 1800:1971 Dimensions of elastomeric toroidal sealing rings for aircraft [Withdrawn without replacement]
 ISO 1802:1992 Natural rubber latex concentrate — Determination of boric acid content
 ISO 1803:1997 Building construction – Tolerances – Expression of dimensional accuracy – Principles and terminology [Withdrawn: replaced with ISO 6707-1]
 ISO 1804:1972 Doors – Terminology [Withdrawn: replaced with ISO 22496]
 ISO 1805:2006 Fishing nets — Determination of breaking force and knot breaking force of netting yarns
 ISO 1806:2002 Fishing nets — Determination of mesh breaking force of netting
 ISO 1807:1975 Continuous mechanical handling equipment for loose bulk materials — Oscillating conveyors and shaking or reciprocating feeders with rectangular or trapezoidal trough
 ISO 1809:1977 Textile machinery and accessories – Types of formers for yarn packages – Nomenclature
 ISO 1810:1976 Copper alloys — Determination of nickel (low contents) — Dimethylglyoxime spectrophotometric method [Withdrawn without replacement]
 ISO 1811 Copper and copper alloys — Selection and preparation of samples for chemical analysis
 ISO 1811-1:1988 Part 1: Sampling of cast unwrought products
 ISO 1811-2:1988 Part 2: Sampling of wrought products and castings
 ISO 1812:1976 Copper alloys — Determination of iron content — 1,10- Phenanthroline spectrophotometric method
 ISO 1813:2014 Belt drives — V-ribbed belts, joined V-belts and V-belts including wide section belts and hexagonal belts — Electrical conductivity of antistatic belts: Characteristics and methods of test
 ISO 1815:1975 Continuous mechanical handling equipment for loose bulk materials — Vibrating feeders and conveyors with tubular trough
 ISO 1816:1975 Continuous mechanical handling equipment for loose bulk materials and unit loads — Belt conveyors — Basic characteristics of motorized driving pulleys
 ISO 1817:2015 Rubber, vulcanized or thermoplastic — Determination of the effect of liquids
 ISO 1818:1975 Vulcanized rubbers of low hardness (10 to 35 IRHD) — Determination of hardness [Withdrawn: replaced with ISO 48, now ISO 48-2]
 ISO 1819:1977 Continuous mechanical handling equipment — Safety code — General rules
 ISO 1820:1975 Continuous mechanical handling equipment for loose bulk materials — Storage equipment : Storage bins and bunkers, silos and hoppers, bin gates — Safety code [Withdrawn: replaced with ISO 8456]
 ISO 1821:1975 Continuous mechanical handling equipment for loose bulk materials — Belt feeders and conveyors — Safety code [Withdrawn: replaced with ISO 8456]
 ISO 1822:1973 Wool — Determination of fibre length using a single-fibre length-measuring machine [Withdrawn: replaced with ISO 6989]
 ISO 1823:2015 Rubber hose and hose assemblies for oil suction and discharge service — Specification
 ISO 1825:2017 Rubber hoses and hose assemblies for aircraft ground fuelling and defuelling — Specification
 ISO 1826:1981 Rubber, vulcanized — Time-interval between vulcanization and testing — Specification [Withdrawn: replaced with ISO 471, and later ISO 23529]
 ISO 1827:2016 Rubber, vulcanized or thermoplastic — Determination of shear modulus and adhesion to rigid plates — Quadruple-shear methods
 ISO 1828:2012 Health informatics – Categorial structure for terminological systems of surgical procedures
 ISO 1829:1975 Selection of tolerance zones for general purposes [Withdrawn: replaced with ISO 286-1]
 ISO 1830:2005 Paper, board and pulps — Determination of acid-soluble manganese [Withdrawn: replaced with ISO 12830]
 ISO 1831:1980 Printing specifications for optical character recognition
 ISO 1832:2017 Indexable inserts for cutting tools — Designation
 ISO 1833 Textiles — Quantitative chemical analysis
 ISO 1833-1:2020 Part 1: General principles of testing
 ISO 1833-2:2020 Part 2: Ternary fibre mixtures
 ISO 1833-3:2019 Part 3: Mixtures of acetate with certain other fibres (method using acetone)
 ISO 1833-4:2017 Part 4: Mixtures of certain protein fibres with certain other fibres (method using hypochlorite)
 ISO 1833-5:2006 Part 5: Mixtures of viscose, cupro or modal and cotton fibres (method using sodium zincate)
 ISO 1833-6:2018 Part 6: Mixtures of viscose, certain types of cupro, modal or lyocell with certain other fibres (method using formic acid and zinc chloride)
 ISO 1833-7:2017 Part 7: Mixtures of polyamide with certain other fibres (method using formic acid)
 ISO 1833-8:2006 Part 8: Part 5: Mixtures of viscose, cupro or modal and cotton fibres (method using sodium zincate)
 ISO 1833-9:2019 Part 9: Mixtures of acetate with certain other fibres (method using benzyl alcohol)
 ISO 1833-10:2019 Part 10: Mixtures of triacetate or polylactide with certain other fibres (method using dichloromethane)
 ISO 1833-11:2017 Part 11: Mixtures of certain cellulose fibres with certain other fibres (method using sulfuric acid)
 ISO 1833-12:2020 Part 12: Mixtures of acrylic, certain modacrylics, certain chlorofibres, certain elastane fibres with certain other fibres (method using dimethylformamide)
 ISO 1833-13:2019 Part 13: Mixtures of certain chlorofibres with certain other fibres (method using carbon disulfide/acetone)
 ISO 1833-14:2019 Part 14: Mixtures of acetate with certain other fibres (method using glacial acetic acid)
 ISO 1833-15:2019 Part 15: Mixtures of jute with certain animal fibres (method by determining nitrogen content)
 ISO 1833-16:2019 Part 16: Mixtures of polypropylene fibres with certain other fibres (method using xylene)
 ISO 1833-17:2019 Part 17: Mixtures of cellulose fibres and certain fibres with chlorofibres and certain other fibres (method using concentrated sulfuric acid)
 ISO 1833-18:2019 Part 18: Mixtures of silk with other protein fibres (method using sulfuric acid)
 ISO 1833-19:2006 Part 19: Mixtures of cellulose fibres and asbestos (method by heating)
 ISO 1833-20:2018 Part 20: Mixtures of elastane with certain other fibres (method using dimethylacetamide)
 ISO 1833-21:2019 Part 21: Mixtures of chlorofibres, certain modacrylics, certain elastanes, acetates, triacetates with certain other fibres (method using cyclohexanone)
 ISO 1833-22:2020 Part 22: Mixtures of viscose or certain types of cupro or modal or lyocell with flax fibres (method using formic acid and zinc chloride)
 ISO 1833-24:2010 Part 24: Mixtures of polyester and certain other fibres (method using phenol and tetrachloroethane)
 ISO 1833-25:2020 Part 25: Mixtures of polyester with certain other fibres (method using trichloroacetic acid and chloroform)
 ISO 1833-26:2020 Part 26: Mixtures of melamine with certain other fibres (method using hot formic acid)
 ISO 1833-27:2018 Part 27: Mixtures of cellulose fibres with certain other fibres (method using aluminium sulfate)
 ISO 1833-28:2019 Part 28: Mixtures of chitosan with certain other fibres (method using diluted acetic acid)
 ISO 1833-29:2020 Part 29: Mixtures of polyamide with polypropylene/polyamide bicomponent (method using sulfuric acid)
 ISO 1834:1999 Short link chain for lifting purposes — General conditions of acceptance
 ISO 1835:2018 Round steel short link chains for lifting purposes — Medium tolerance sling chains — Grade 4, stainless steel
 ISO 1836:1980 Short link chain for lifting purposes — Grade M (4), calibrated, for chain hoists and other lifting appliances [Withdrawn without replacement]
 ISO 1837:2003 Lifting hooks – Nomenclature
 ISO 1838:1993 Fresh pineapples — Storage and transport
 ISO 1839:1980 Tea — Sampling
 ISO 1840:1976 Definitions of living animals for slaughter — Porcines [Withdrawn without replacement]
 ISO 1841 Meat and meat products — Determination of chloride content
 ISO 1841-1:1996 Part 1: Volhard method
 ISO 1841-2:1996 Part 2: Potentiometric method
 ISO 1842:1991 Fruit and vegetable products — Determination of pH
 ISO 1843 Higher alcohols for industrial use — Methods of test (ISO/R 1843:1970 was Higher alcohols for industrial use — measurement of colour in Hazen units)
 ISO 1843-1:1977 Part 1: General [Withdrawn without replacement]
 ISO 1843-2:1977 Part 2: Determination of acidity to phenolphthalein — Titrimetric method [Withdrawn without replacement]
 ISO 1843-3:1977 Part 3: Determination of carbonyl compounds content — Potentiometric method [Withdrawn without replacement]
 ISO 1843-4:1977 Part 4: Determination of bromine number — Titrimetric method in the presence of mercury(II) chloride [Withdrawn without replacement]
 ISO 1843-5:1977 Part 5: Determination of total alcohols content — Titrimetric method [Withdrawn without replacement]
 ISO 1843-6:1977 Part 6: Determination of ash [Withdrawn without replacement]
 ISO 1843-7:1982 Part 7: Determination of distillation yield [Withdrawn without replacement]
 ISO 1843-8:1982 Part 8: Sulphuric acid colour test [Withdrawn without replacement]
 ISO/R 1844:1970 Higher alcohols for industrial use — Determination of density at 20 degrees C [Withdrawn: replaced with ISO 1843-1, now withdrawn without replacement]
 ISO/R 1845:1970 Higher alcohols for industrial use — Determination of distillation yield [Withdrawn: replaced with ISO 1843-7, now withdrawn without replacement]
 ISO/R 1846:1970 Higher alcohols for industrial use — Determination of acidity to phenolphthalein — Titrimetric method [Withdrawn: replaced with ISO 1843-2, now withdrawn without replacement]
 ISO/R 1847:1970 Higher alcohols for industrial use — Determination of carbonyl compounds content — Potentiometric method [Withdrawn: replaced with ISO 1843-3, now withdrawn without replacement]
 ISO/R 1848:1970 Higher alcohols for industrial use — Determination of bromine number — Titrimetric method in the presence of mercury(II) chloride [Withdrawn: replaced with ISO 1843-4, now withdrawn without replacement]
 ISO/R 1849:1970 Higher alcohols for industrial use — Determination of water content by the Karl Fischer method [Withdrawn: replaced with ISO 1843-1, now withdrawn without replacement]
 ISO/R 1850:1970 Higher alcohols for industrial use — Determination of total alcohols content — Titrimetric method [Withdrawn: replaced with ISO 1843-5, now withdrawn without replacement]
 ISO/R 1851:1970 Higher alcohols for industrial use — Determination of ash [Withdrawn: replaced with ISO 1843-6, now withdrawn without replacement]
 ISO/R 1852:1970 Higher alcohols for industrial use — Sulphuric acid colour test [Withdrawn: replaced with ISO 1843-8, now withdrawn without replacement]
 ISO 1853:2018 Conducting and dissipative rubbers, vulcanized or thermoplastic — Measurement of resistivity
 ISO 1854:2008 Whey cheese — Determination of fat content — Gravimetric method (Reference method)
 ISO/R 1855:1975 Cellular rubbers – Determination of apparent density [Withdrawn: replaced with ISO 845]
 ISO 1856:2018 Flexible cellular polymeric materials — Determination of compression set
 ISO 1858:1977 Information processing – General purpose hubs and reels, with 76 mm (3 in) centrehole, for magnetic tape used in interchange instrumentation applications
 ISO 1859:1973 Information processing – Unrecorded magnetic tapes for interchange instrumentation applications – General dimensional requirements
 ISO 1860:1986 Information processing – Precision reels for magnetic tape used in interchange instrumentation applications
 ISO 1861:1975 Information processing – 7- track, 12,7 mm (0.5 in) wide magnetic tape for information interchange recorded at 8 rpmm (200 rpi) [Withdrawn without replacement]
 ISO 1862:1975 Information processing – 9- track, 12,7 mm (0.5 in) wide magnetic tape for information interchange recorded at 8 rpmm (200 rpi) [Withdrawn without replacement]
 ISO/IEC 1863:1990 Information processing – 9-track, 12,7 mm (0,5 in) wide magnetic tape for information interchange using NRZ1 at 32 ftpmm (800 ftpi) – 32 cpmm (800 cpi)
 ISO/IEC 1864:1992 Information technology – Unrecorded 12,7 mm (0,5 in) wide magnetic tape for information interchange – 32 ftpmm (800 ftpi), NRZ1, 126 ftpmm (3 200 ftpi) phase encoded and 356 ftpmm (9 042 ftpi), NRZ1
 ISO 1865:1977 Textile machinery and accessories — Serrated bars for mechanical warp stop motions — Designations of dimensions, and dimensions of cross-section
 ISO 1866:1975 Pelletized carbon black for use in the rubber industry delivered in bulk or in bins — Specification for maximum fines content [Withdrawn without replacement]
 ISO 1867:1975 Carbon black for use in the rubber industry — Specification for sieve residue [Withdrawn without replacement]
 ISO 1868:1982 Rubber compounding ingredients — Carbon black — Specification limits for loss on heating [Withdrawn without replacement]
 ISO 1869:1977 Methylene chloride for industrial use — List of methods of test [Withdrawn without replacement]
 ISO 1870:1977 Chloroform for industrial use — List of methods of test [Withdrawn without replacement]
 ISO 1871:1979 Food and feed products — General guidelines for the determination of nitrogen by the Kjeldahl method
 ISO 1872 Plastics — Polyethylene (PE) moulding and extrusion materials
 ISO 1872-1:1993 Part 1: Designation system and basis for specifications [Withdrawn: replaced with ISO 17855-1]
 ISO 1872-2:2007 Part 2: Preparation of test specimens and determination of properties [Withdrawn: replaced with ISO 17855-2]
 ISO 1873 Plastics — Polypropylene (PP) moulding and extrusion materials
 ISO 1873-1:1995 Part 1: Designation system and basis for specifications [Withdrawn: replaced with ISO 19069-1]
 ISO 1873-2:2007 Part 2: Preparation of test specimens and determination of properties [Withdrawn: replaced with ISO 19069-2]
 ISO 1874 Plastics — Polyamide (PA) moulding and extrusion materials
 ISO 1874-1:2010 Part 1: Designation system and basis for specifications [Withdrawn: replaced with ISO 16396-1]
 ISO 1874-2:2012 Part 2: Preparation of test specimens and determination of properties [Withdrawn: replaced with ISO 16396-2]
 ISO 1875:1982 Plastics — Plasticized cellulose acetate — Determination of matter extractable by diethyl ether
 ISO 1876 Swing doors — Dimensioning rules [Rejected draft]
 ISO 1877 Single-leaf wooden swing doors — Principal dimensions  [Rejected draft]
 ISO 1878:1983 Classification of instruments and devices for measurement and evaluation of the geometrical parameters of surface finish [Withdrawn without replacement]
 ISO 1879:1981 Instruments for the measurement of surface roughness by the profile method — Vocabulary [Withdrawn without replacement]
 ISO 1880:1979 Instruments for the measurement of surface roughness by the profile method — Contact (stylus) instruments of progressive profile transformation — Profile recording instruments [Withdrawn: replaced with ISO 3274]
 ISO 1881:1973 Coke not greater than 60 mm top size — Determination of mechanical strength
 ISO/R 1882 Vocabulary of terms relating to solid mineral fuels — Part 2: Terms relating to coal sampling and analysis [Draft named ISO/R 1223-2]
 ISO/R 1883 Vocabulary of terms relating to solid mineral fuels — Part 3: Terms relating to coke [Draft named ISO/R 1223-3]
 ISO 1886:1990 Reinforcement fibres — Sampling plans applicable to received batches [Withdrawn without replacement]
 ISO 1887:2014 Textile glass — Determination of combustible-matter content
 ISO 1888:2022 Textile glass — Staple fibres or filaments — Determination of average diameter
 ISO 1889:2009 Reinforcement yarns — Determination of linear density
 ISO 1890:2009 Reinforcement yarns — Determination of twist
 ISO 1891:2009 Fasteners – Terminology
 ISO 1891-2:2014 Part 2: Vocabulary and definitions for coatings
 ISO 1893:2007 Refractory products — Determination of refractoriness under load — Differential method with rising temperature
 ISO 1894:1979 General purpose Series 1 freight containers — Minimum internal dimensions [Withdrawn: Replaced with ISO 1496-1]
 ISO/TR 1896:1991 Products in fibre-reinforced cement — Non-combustible fibre-reinforced boards of calcium silicate or cement for insulation and fire protection [Withdrawn without replacement]
 ISO 1897:1977 Phenol, o-cresol, m-cresol, p-cresol, cresylic acid and xylenols for industrial use — Methods of test (ISO/R 1897 was Phenol, o-cresol, m-cresol, p-cresol, cresylic acid and xylenols for industrial use — Determination of water content by the Karl Fischer method)
 ISO 1897-1:1977 Part 1: General [Withdrawn without replacement]
 ISO 1897-2:1977 Part 2: Determination of water — Dean and Stark method [Withdrawn without replacement]
 ISO 1897-3:1977 Part 3: Determination of neutral oils and pyridine bases [Withdrawn without replacement]
 ISO 1897-4:1977 Part 4: Visual test for impurities insoluble in sodium hydroxide solution (Excluding cresylic acid and xylenols) [Withdrawn without replacement]
 ISO 1897-5:1977 Part 5: Visual test for impurities insoluble in water (Phenol only) [Withdrawn without replacement]
 ISO 1897-6:1977 Part 6: Test for absence of hydrogen sulphide (Cresylic acid and xylenols only) [Withdrawn without replacement]
 ISO 1897-7:1977 Part 7: Measurement of colour (Cresylic acid and xylenols only) [Withdrawn without replacement]
 ISO 1897-8:1977 Part 8: Determination of o-cresol content (Cresylic acid and xylenols only) [Withdrawn without replacement]
 ISO 1897-9:1977 Part 9: Determination of m-cresol content (Cresylic acid only) [Withdrawn without replacement]
 ISO 1897-10:1982 Part 10: Determination of dry residue after evaporation on a water bath (Excluding cresylic acid and xylenols) [Withdrawn without replacement]
 ISO 1897-11:1983 Part 11: Determination of crystallizing point (Excluding cresylic acid and xylenols) [Withdrawn without replacement]
 ISO 1897-12:1983 Part 12: Determination of distillation characteristics (Cresylic acid and xylenols only) [Withdrawn without replacement]
 ISO 1897-13:1983 Part 13: Determination of residue on distillation (Cresylic acid and xylenols only) [Withdrawn without replacement]
 ISO/R 1898:1971 Phenol, o-cresol, m-cresol, p-cresol, cresylic acid and xylenols for industrial use — Determination of water — Dean and Stark method [Withdrawn: Replaced with ISO 1897-2]
 ISO/R 1899:1971 Phenol, o-cresol, m-cresol, p-cresol, cresylic acid and xylenols for industrial use — Determination of neutral oils and pyridine bases [Withdrawn: Replaced with ISO 1897-3]
 ISO/R 1900:1971 Phenol, o-cresol, m-cresol, and p-cresol for industrial use — Determination of dry residue after evaporation on a water bath [Withdrawn: Replaced with ISO 1897-10]
 ISO/R 1901:1971 Phenol, o-cresol, m-cresol, and p-cresol for industrial use — Determination of crystallizing point [Withdrawn: Replaced with ISO 1897-11]
 ISO/R 1902:1971 Phenol, o-cresol, m-cresol, and p-cresol for industrial use — Visual test for impurities insoluble in sodium hydroxide solution [Withdrawn: Replaced with ISO 1897-4]
 ISO/R 1903:1971 Phenol, m-cresol, cresylic acid and xylenols for industrial use — Determination of density at 20 degrees C [Withdrawn: Replaced with ISO 1897-1]
 ISO 1904:1972 Liquefied phenol for industrial use — Determination of phenols content — Bromination method [Withdrawn without replacement]
 ISO/R 1905:1971 Liquefied phenol for industrial use — Visual test for impurities insoluble in water [Withdrawn: Replaced with ISO 1897-5]
 ISO/R 1906:1971 Cresylic acid and xylenols for industrial use — Determination of distillation characteristics [Withdrawn: Replaced with ISO 1897-12]
 ISO/R 1907:1971 Cresylic acid and xylenols for industrial use — Determination of residue on distillation [Withdrawn: Replaced with ISO 1897-13]
 ISO/R 1908:1971 Cresylic acid and xylenols for industrial use — Test for absence of hydrogen sulphide [Withdrawn: Replaced with ISO 1897-6]
 ISO/R 1909:1971 Cresylic acid and xylenols for industrial use — Measurement of colour [Withdrawn: Replaced with ISO 1897-7]
 ISO/R 1910:1971 Cresylic acid and xylenols for industrial use — Determination of o-cresol content [Withdrawn: Replaced with ISO 1897-8]
 ISO/R 1911:1971 Cresylic acid for industrial use — Determination of crystallizing point [Withdrawn: Replaced with ISO 1897-9]
 ISO/R 1912:1971 Paper vocabulary — Sixth series of terms (Definition of optical properties) [Withdrawn: Replaced with ISO 4046]
 ISO/R 1913:1971 Formic acid for industrial use — Determination of low contents of other volatile acids — Titrimetric method after distillation [Withdrawn: replaced with ISO 731-7, now withdrawn without replacement]
 ISO 1914:1972 Boric acid for industrial use — Determination of boric acid content — Volumetric method [Withdrawn without replacement]
 ISO 1915:1972 Boric oxide for industrial use — Determination of boric oxide content — Volumetric method [Withdrawn without replacement]
 ISO 1916:1972 Disodium tetraborates for industrial use — Determination of sodium oxide and boric oxide contents and loss on ignition [Withdrawn without replacement]
 ISO 1917:1972 Hydrated sodium perborates for industrial use — Determination of sodium oxide, boric oxide and available oxygen contents — Volumetric methods [Withdrawn without replacement]
 ISO 1918:1972 Boric acid, boric oxide, disodium tetraborates and crude sodium borates for industrial use — Determination of sulphur compounds — Volumetric method [Withdrawn without replacement]
 ISO 1919:1998 Road vehicles — M14 x 1,25 spark-plugs with flat seating and their cylinder head housings [Withdrawn without replacement]
 ISO 1920 Testing of concrete
 ISO 1920-1:2004 Part 1: Sampling of fresh concrete
 ISO 1920-2:2016 Part 2: Properties of fresh concrete
 ISO 1920-3:2019 Part 3: Making and curing test specimens
 ISO 1920-4:2020 Part 4: Strength of hardened concrete
 ISO 1920-5:2018 Part 5: Density and water penetration depth
 ISO 1920-6:2019 Part 6: Sampling, preparing and testing of concrete cores
 ISO 1920-7:2004 Part 7: Non-destructive tests on hardened concrete
 ISO 1920-8:2009 Part 8: Determination of drying shrinkage of concrete for samples prepared in the field or in the laboratory
 ISO 1920-9:2009 Part 9: Determination of creep of concrete cylinders in compression
 ISO 1920-10:2010 Part 10: Determination of static modulus of elasticity in compression
 ISO 1920-11:2013 Part 11: Determination of the chloride resistance of concrete, unidirectional diffusion
 ISO 1920-12:2015 Part 12: Determination of the carbonation resistance of concrete — Accelerated carbonation method
 ISO 1920-13:2018 Part 13: Properties of fresh self compacting concrete
 ISO 1920-14:2019 Part 14: Setting time of concrete mixtures by resistance to penetration
 ISO 1922:2018 Rigid cellular plastics — Determination of shear properties
 ISO 1923:1981 Cellular plastics and rubbers — Determination of linear dimensions
 ISO 1924 Paper and board — Determination of tensile properties
 ISO 1924-1:1992 Part 1: Constant rate of loading method [Withdrawn without replacement]
 ISO 1924-2:2008 Part 2: Constant rate of elongation method (20 mm/min)
 ISO 1924-3:2005 Part 3: Constant rate of elongation method (100 mm/min)
 ISO 1925:2001 Mechanical vibration — Balancing — Vocabulary [Withdrawn: replaced with ISO 21940-2]
 ISO 1926:2009 Rigid cellular plastics — Determination of tensile properties
 ISO 1927 Monolithic (unshaped) refractory products
 ISO 1927-1:2012 Part 1: Introduction and classification
 ISO 1927-2:2012 Part 2: Sampling for testing
 ISO 1927-3:2012 Part 3: Characterization as received
 ISO 1927-4:2012 Part 4: Determination of consistency of castables
 ISO 1927-5:2012 Part 5: Preparation and treatment of test pieces
 ISO 1927-6:2012 Part 6: Measurement of physical properties
 ISO 1927-7:2012 Part 7: Tests on pre-formed shapes
 ISO 1927-8:2012 Part 8: Determination of complementary properties
 ISO 1928:2020 Coal and coke — Determination of gross calorific value
 ISO 1929:1993 Abrasive belts — Dimensions, tolerances and designation
 ISO 1938 Geometrical product specifications (GPS) – Dimensional measuring equipment
 ISO 1938-1:2015 Part 1: Plain limit gauges of linear size
 ISO 1938-2:2017 Part 2: Reference disk gauges
 ISO/R 1939:1970 Pneumatic cylinders – cylinder bores and port sizes [Withdrawn without replacement]
 ISO 1940 Mechanical vibration — Balance quality requirements for rotors in a constant (rigid) state
 ISO 1940-1:2003 Part 1: Specification and verification of balance tolerances [Withdrawn: replaced with ISO 21940-11]
 ISO 1940-2:1997 Part 2: Mechanical vibration — Balance quality requirements of rigid rotors — Part 2: Balance errors [Withdrawn: replaced with ISO 21940-14]
 ISO/R 1941:1970 Flat seal for hydraulic couplings [Withdrawn without replacement]
 ISO 1942:2020 Dentistry – Vocabulary
 ISO/R 1943:1970 Coupling Threads for Hydraulic or Pneumatic Piping [Withdrawn: replaced with ISO 1179-(1-4)]
 ISO/R 1944:1970 Pipe couplings for hydraulic piping (pipe threads) [Withdrawn without replacement]
 ISO 1946:1976 Textile machinery and accessories — Condenser bobbins for woollen spinning — Dimensions [Withdrawn without replacement]
 ISO 1947:1973 System of cone tolerances for conical workpieces from C = 1:3 to 1:500 and lengths from 6 to 630 mm [Withdrawn without replacement]
 ISO 1948:1987 Photography — Front lens barrels up to 127 mm — Dimensions important to the connection of auxiliaries
 ISO 1949:1987 Aircraft — Electrical connectors — Design requirements
 ISO 1950:1974 Aircraft — Identification of servicing, maintenance, ground handling and safety/hazard points [Withdrawn without replacement]
 ISO 1951:2007 Presentation/representation of entries in dictionaries – Requirements, recommendations and information
 ISO 1952:2008 Solid mineral fuels — Determination of extractable metals in dilute hydrochloric acid
 ISO 1953:2015 Hard coal — Size analysis by sieving
 ISO 1954:2013 Plywood — Tolerances on dimensions
 ISO 1955:1982 Citrus fruits and derived products — Determination of essential oils content (Reference method)
 ISO 1956 Fruits and vegetables – Morphological and structural terminology
 ISO 1956-1:1982 (No part title)
 ISO 1956-2:1989 (No part title)
 ISO 1957:2000 Machine-made textile floor coverings — Selection and cutting of specimens for physical tests
 ISO 1958:1973 Textile floor coverings — Determination of mass of total pile yarn per unit area [Withdrawn: replaced with ISO 8543]
 ISO 1959:1973 Textile floor coverings — Determination of measured surface pile density and measured pile fibre volume ratio [Withdrawn: replaced with ISO 8543]
 ISO 1963:1973 Aircraft — Interchangeability dimensions of battery connectors for automatic coupling [Withdrawn without replacement]
 ISO 1964:1987 Shipbuilding – Indication of details on the general arrangement plans of ships
 ISO 1965:1973 Aluminium terminal ends for crimping to aircraft aluminium electrical cables
 ISO 1966:1973 Crimped joints for aircraft electrical cables
 ISO 1967:1974 Aircraft — Fire-resisting electrical cables — Dimensions, conductor resistance and mass
 ISO 1968:2004 Fibre ropes and cordage – Vocabulary
 ISO 1969:2004 Fibre ropes — Polyethylene — 3- and 4-strand ropes
 ISO 1970:1973 Ropes and cordage — Eight-strand plaited manila and sisal ropes [Withdrawn without replacement]
 ISO 1971:1975 Aircraft — Accessory drives and mounting pads
 ISO 1973:2021 Textile fibres — Determination of linear density — Gravimetric method and vibroscope method
 ISO 1974:2012 Paper — Determination of tearing resistance — Elmendorf method
 ISO 1975:1973 Magnesium and magnesium alloys — Determination of silicon — Spectrophotometric method with the reduced silicomolybdic complex
 ISO 1976:1975 Zinc alloys — Determination of copper content — Electrolytic method [Withdrawn without replacement]
 ISO 1977:2006 Conveyor chains, attachments and sprockets
 ISO 1980:1977 Nitric acid for industrial use — Determination of total acidity — Titrimetric method [Withdrawn without replacement]
 ISO 1981:1977 Nitric acid for industrial use — Determination of nitrous compounds — Titrimetric method [Withdrawn without replacement]
 ISO/R 1982:1971 Nitric acid for industrial use — Determination of iron content — 2,2'- Bipyridyl photometric method [Withdrawn without replacement]
 ISO 1983:1977 Nitric acid for industrial use — Determination of sulphated ash — Gravimetric method [Withdrawn without replacement]
 ISO 1984 Test conditions for manually controlled milling machines with table of fixed height – Testing of the accuracy
 ISO 1984-1:2001 Part 1: Machines with horizontal spindle
 ISO 1984-2:2001 Part 2: Machines with vertical spindle
 ISO 1985:2015 Machine tools — Test conditions for surface grinding machines with vertical grinding wheel spindle and reciprocating table — Testing of the accuracy
 ISO 1986 Test conditions for surface grinding machines with horizontal grinding wheel spindle and reciprocating table — Testing of the accuracy
 ISO 1986-1:2014 Part 1: Machines with table length of up to 1 600 mm
 ISO 1988:1975 Hard coal — Sampling [Withdrawn: replaced with ISO 18283]
 ISO/IEC 1989:2014 Information technology – Programming languages, their environments and system software interfaces – Programming language COBOL
 ISO 1990 Fruits – Nomenclature
 ISO 1990-1:1982 First list
 ISO 1990-2:1985 Second list
 ISO 1991 Vegetables – Nomenclature
 ISO 1991-1:1982 First list
 ISO 1991-2:1995 Part 2: Second list
 ISO 1992 Commercial refrigerated cabinets — Methods of test
 ISO 1992-1:1974 Part 1: Calculation of linear dimensions, areas and volumes [Withdrawn without replacement]
 ISO 1992-2:1973 Part 2: General test conditions [Withdrawn without replacement]
 ISO 1992-3:1973 Part 3: Temperature test [Withdrawn without replacement]
 ISO 1992-4:1974 Part 4: Defrosting test [Withdrawn without replacement]
 ISO 1992-5:1974 Part 5: Water vapour condensation test [Withdrawn without replacement]
 ISO 1992-6:1974 Part 6: Electrical energy consumption test [Withdrawn without replacement]
 ISO 1993 [Draft renamed ISO 1992-2]
 ISO 1994:1976 Hard coal — Determination of oxygen content [Withdrawn without replacement]
 ISO 1995:1981 Aromatic hydrocarbons — Sampling
 ISO 1996 Acoustics – Description, measurement and assessment of environmental noise
 ISO 1996-1:2016 Part 1: Basic quantities and assessment procedures
 ISO 1996-2:2017 Part 2: Determination of sound pressure levels
 ISO 1997:2018 Granulated cork and cork powder — Classification, properties and packing
 ISO 1998 Petroleum industry – Terminology
 ISO 1998-1:1998 Part 1: Raw materials and products
 ISO 1998-2:1998 Part 2: Properties and tests
 ISO 1998-3:1998 Part 3: Exploration and production
 ISO 1998-4:1998 Part 4: Refining
 ISO 1998-5:1998 Part 5: Transport, storage, distribution
 ISO 1998-6:2000 Part 6: Measurement
 ISO 1998-7:1998 Part 7: Miscellaneous terms
 ISO 1998–99:2000 Part 99: General and index
 ISO 1999:2013 Acoustics – Estimation of noise-induced hearing loss

Notes

References

External links 
 International Organization for Standardization
 ISO Certification Provider
 ISO Consultant

International Organization for Standardization